= Very-high-density cable interconnect =

68-pin connector used for SCSI

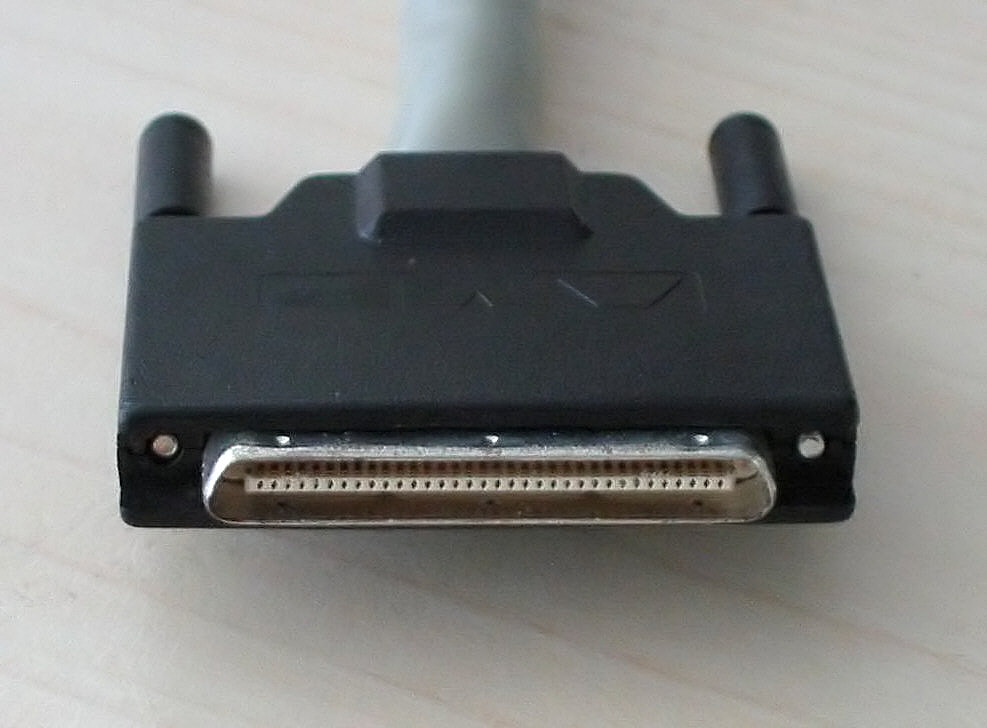
A VHDCI connector.

A very-high-density cable interconnect (VHDCI) is a 68-pin connector that was introduced in the SPI-2 document of SCSI-3. The VHDCI connector is a very small connector that allows placement of four wide SCSI connectors on the back of a single PCI card slot. Physically, it looks like a miniature Centronics type connector. It uses the regular 68-contact pin assignment. The male connector (plug) is used on the cable and the female connector ("receptacle") on the device.

== Other uses ==
Apart from the standardized use with the SCSI interface, several vendors have also used VHDCI connectors for other types of interfaces:

- Nvidia: for an external PCI Express 8-lane interconnect, and used in Quadro Plex VCS and in Quadro NVS 420 as a display port connector
- ATI Technologies: on the FireMV 2400 to convey two DVI and two VGA signals on a single connector, and ganging two of these connectors side by side in order to allow the FireMV 2400 to be a low-profile quad display card. The Radeon X1950 XTX Crossfire Edition also used a pair of the connectors to grant more inter-card bandwidth than the PCI Express bus allowed at the time for Crossfire.
- AMD: Some Visiontek variants of the Radeon HD 7750 use a VHDCI connector alongside a Mini DisplayPort to allow a 5 (breakout to 4 HDMI+1 mDP) display Eyefinity array on a low profile card. VisionTek also released a similar Radeon HD 5570, though it lacked a Mini DisplayPort.
- Juniper Networks: for their 12- and 48-port 100BASE-TX PICs (physical interface cards). The cable connects to the VHDCI connector on the PIC on one end, via an RJ-21 connector on the other end, to an RJ-45 patch panel.
- Cisco: 3750 StackWise stacking cables
- National Instruments: on their high-speed digital I/O cards.
- AudioScience uses VHDCI to carry multiple analog balanced audio and digital AES/EBU audio streams, and clock and GPIO signals.

== See also ==
- SCSI connector
