= AMD Eyefinity =

Brand of AMD video card products

- Design firm: Advanced Micro Devices
- Introduced: September 2009
- Type: Multi-monitor or video walls
- Ports: DisplayPort, HDMI, DVI, VGA, DMS-59, VHDCI

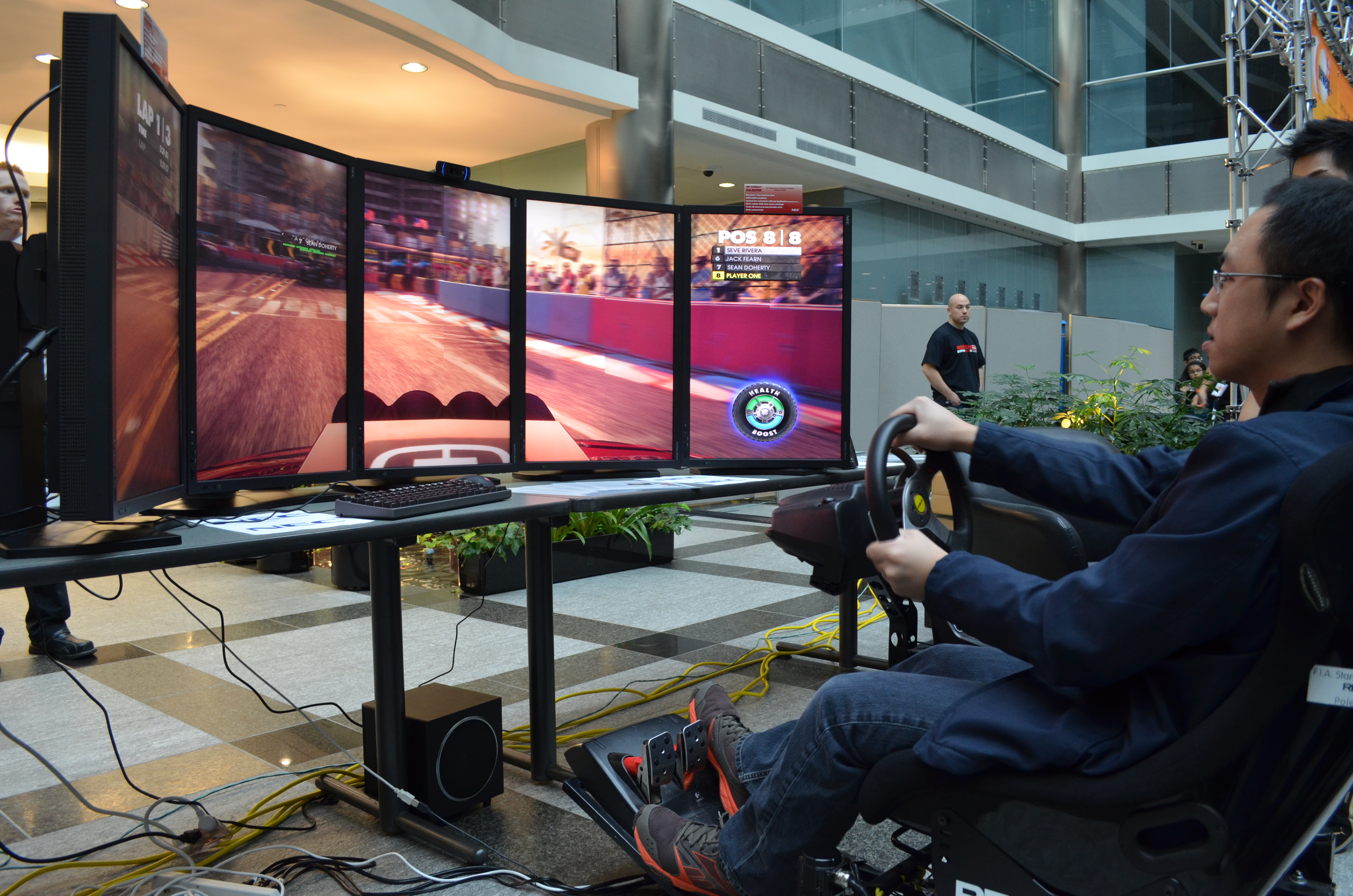
Playing a racing video game on Single Large Surface (SLS) with a 5x1 portrait display group configuration at ExtravaLANza 2012 in Toronto

AMD Eyefinity is a brand name for AMD video card products that support multi-monitor setups by integrating multiple (up to six) display controllers on one GPU. AMD Eyefinity was introduced with the Radeon HD 5000 series "Evergreen" in September 2009 and has been available on APUs and professional-grade graphics cards branded AMD FirePro as well.

AMD Eyefinity supports a maximum of 2 non-DisplayPort displays (e.g., HDMI, DVI, VGA, DMS-59, VHDCI) (which AMD calls "legacy output") and up to 6 DisplayPort displays simultaneously using a single graphics card or APU. To feed more than two displays, the additional panels must have native DisplayPort support. Alternatively active DisplayPort-to-DVI/HDMI/VGA adapters can be employed.

The setup of large video walls by connecting multiple computers over Gigabit Ethernet or Ethernet is also supported.

The version of AMD Eyefinity (aka DCE, display controller engine) introduced with Excavator-based Carrizo APUs features a Video underlay pipe.

== Overview ==
AMD Eyefinity is implemented by multiple on-die display controllers. The HD 5000-series designs host two internal clocks and one external clock. Displays connected over VGA, DVI, or HDMI each require their own internal clock. But all displays connected over DisplayPort can be driven from only one external clock. This external clock is what allows Eyefinity to fuel up to six monitors from a single card.

The entire HD 5000 series of products have Eyefinity capabilities supporting three outputs. The Radeon HD 5870 Eyefinity Edition, however, supports six mini DisplayPort outputs, all of which can be simultaneously active.

The display controller has two RAMDACs that drive the VGA or DVI ports in analog mode. For example, when a DVI-to-VGA converter is attached to a DVI port). It also has a maximum of six digital transmitters that can output either a DisplayPort signal or a TMDS signal for either DVI or HDMI, and two clock signal generators to drive the digital outputs in TMDS mode. Dual-link DVI displays use two of the TMDS/DisplayPort transmitters and one clock signal each. Single-link DVI displays and HDMI displays use one TMDS/DisplayPort transmitter and one clock signal each. DisplayPort displays use one TMDS/DisplayPort transmitter and no clock signal.

An active DisplayPort adapter can convert a DisplayPort signal to another type of signal—like VGA, single-link DVI, or dual-link DVI; or HDMI if more than two non-DisplayPort displays must be connected to a Radeon HD 5000 series graphics card.

DisplayPort 1.2 added the possibility to drive multiple displays on single DisplayPort connector, called Multi-Stream Transport (MST). AMD graphics solutions equipped with DisplayPort 1.2 outputs can run multiple monitors from a single port.

At High-Performance Graphics 2010 Mark Fowler presented the Evergreen and stated that e.g. 5870 (Cypress), 5770 (Juniper) and 5670 (Redwood) support max resolution of the 6 times 2560×1600 pixels, while the 5470 (Cedar) supports 4 times 2560×1600 pixels.

== Availability ==
=== Feature overview for AMD graphics cards ===
All AMD GPUs starting with the Evergreen series support a maximum of 2 non-DisplayPort displays and a maximum of 6 DisplayPort displays per graphics card.

The following table shows features of AMD/ATI's GPUs (see also: List of AMD graphics processing units).

Name of GPU series	Wonder	Mach	3D Rage	Rage Pro	Rage 128	R100	R200	R300	R400	R500	R600	RV670	R700	Evergreen	Northern Islands		Southern Islands	Sea Islands	Volcanic Islands	Arctic Islands/Polaris	Vega	Navi 1x	Navi 2x	Navi 3x	Navi 4x
Released	1986	1991	Apr; 1996	Mar; 1997	Aug; 1998	Apr; 2000	Aug; 2001	Sep; 2002	May; 2004	Oct; 2005	May; 2007	Nov; 2007	Jun; 2008	Sep; 2009	Oct; 2010	Dec; 2010	Jan; 2012	Sep; 2013	Jun; 2015	Jun 2016, Apr 2017, Aug 2019	Jun 2017, Feb 2019	Jul; 2019	Nov; 2020	Dec; 2022	Feb; 2025
Marketing Name	Wonder	Mach	3D; Rage	Rage; Pro	Rage; 128	Radeon; 7000	Radeon; 8000	Radeon; 9000	Radeon; X700/X800	Radeon; X1000	Radeon; HD 2000	Radeon; HD 3000	Radeon; HD 4000	Radeon; HD 5000	Radeon; HD 6000		Radeon; HD 7000	Radeon; 200	Radeon; 300	Radeon; 400/500/600	Radeon; RX Vega, Radeon VII	Radeon; RX 5000	Radeon; RX 6000	Radeon; RX 7000	Radeon; RX 9000
AMD support	Ended																			Current					
Kind	2D		3D																						
Instruction set architecture	Not publicly known										TeraScale instruction set						GCN instruction set					RDNA instruction set			
Microarchitecture	Not publicly known					GFX1		GFX2			TeraScale 1 (VLIW5) (GFX3)			TeraScale 2 (VLIW5) (GFX4)	TeraScale 2 (VLIW5) up to 68xx (GFX4)	TeraScale 3 (VLIW4) in 69xx (GFX5)	GCN 1st gen (GFX6)	GCN 2nd gen (GFX7)	GCN 3rd gen (GFX8)	GCN 4th gen (GFX8)	GCN 5th gen (GFX9)	RDNA (GFX10.1)	RDNA 2 (GFX10.3)	RDNA 3 (GFX11)	RDNA 4 (GFX12)
Type	Fixed pipeline (Note: The Radeon 100 Series has programmable pixel shaders, but do not fully comply with DirectX 8 or Pixel Shader 1.0. See article on R100's pixel shaders.)						Programmable pixel & vertex pipelines				Unified shader model														
Direct3D	—N/a		5.0	6.0		7.0	8.1	9.0; 11 (9_2)	9.0b 11 (9_2)	9.0c 11 (9_3)	10.0; 11 (10_0)	10.1; 11 (10_1)		11 (11_0)			11 (11_1); 12 (11_1)	11 (12_0); 12 (12_0)			11 (12_1); 12 (12_1)		11 (12_1); 12 (12_2)		
Shader model	—N/a						1.4	2.0+	2.0b	3.0	4.0	4.1		5.0			5.1	5.1; 6.5			6.7				6.8
OpenGL	—N/a			1.1	1.2	1.3		1.5 (Note: R300, R400 and R500 based cards do not fully comply with OpenGL 2+ as the hardware does not support all types of non-power of two (NPOT) textures.)			3.3			4.5 (Windows), 4.6 (Linux Mesa 25.2+)			4.6 (Note: OpenGL 4+ compliance requires supporting FP64 shaders and these are emulated on some TeraScale chips using 32-bit hardware.)								
Vulkan	—N/a															1.1 (Note: Vulkan support is theoretically possible but has not been implemented in a stable driver.)	1.3 (Note: Vulkan support in Linux relies on the amdgpu kernel driver which is incomplete and not enabled by default for GFX6 and GFX7.)		1.4						
OpenCL	—N/a										Close to Metal		1.1 (not supported by Mesa)	1.2+ (on Linux: 1.1+ (no Image support on Clover, with Rusticl) with Mesa, 1.2+ on GCN 1.Gen)				2.0+ (Adrenalin driver on Win 7+) (on Linux ROCm, Mesa 1.2+ (no support in Clover, only Rusticl, Mesa, 2.0+ and 3.0 with AMD drivers or AMD ROCm), 5th gen: 2.2 win 10+ and Linux RocM 5.0+				2.2+ and 3.0 Windows 8.1+ and Linux ROCm 5.0+ (Mesa Rusticl 1.2+ and 3.0 (2.1+ and 2.2+))			
HSA / ROCm	—N/a																Yes					?			
Video decoding ASIC	—N/a										Avivo/UVD	UVD+	UVD 2	UVD 2.2	UVD 3		UVD 4	UVD 4.2	UVD 5.0 or 6.0	UVD 6.3	UVD 7 (Note: The UVD and VCE were replaced by the Video Core Next (VCN) ASIC in the Raven Ridge APU implementation of Vega.)	VCN 2.0	VCN 3.0	VCN 4.0	VCN 5.0
Video encoding ASIC	—N/a																VCE 1.0	VCE 2.0	VCE 3.0 or 3.1	VCE 3.4	VCE 4.0	VCN 2.0	VCN 3.0	VCN 4.0	VCN 5.0
Fluid Motion (Note: Video processing for video frame rate interpolation technique. In Windows it works as a DirectShow filter in your player. In Linux, there is no support on the part of drivers and / or community.)	No																	Yes				No		?	
Power saving	?										PowerPlay				PowerTune		PowerTune & ZeroCore Power					?			
TrueAudio	—N/a																	Via dedicated DSP		Via shaders					
FreeSync	—N/a																	1; 2							
HDCP (Note: To play protected video content, it also requires card, operating system, driver, and application support. A compatible HDCP display is also needed for this. HDCP is mandatory for the output of certain audio formats, placing additional constraints on the multimedia setup.)	—N/a										?							1.4		2.2		2.3			
PlayReady	—N/a																			3.0	No	3.0			
Supported displays (Note: More displays may be supported with native DisplayPort connections, or splitting the maximum resolution between multiple monitors with active converters.)						1–2	2							2–6								?			4
Max. resolution	?													2–6 × 2560×1600			2–6 × 4096×2160 @ 30 Hz			2–6 × 5120×2880 @ 60 Hz	3 × 7680×4320 @ 60 Hz	7680×4320 @ 60 Hz PowerColor		7680x4320 @165 Hz	7680x4320
/drm/radeon (Note: DRM (Direct Rendering Manager) is a component of the Linux kernel. AMDgpu is the Linux kernel module. Support in this table refers to the most current version.)						Yes													—N/a						
/drm/amdgpu	—N/a																	Optional	Yes						

=== Feature overview for AMD APUs ===
AMD Eyefinity is also available in AMD's APU branded product line. The A10-7850K is said to support up to four displays.

The following table shows features of AMD's processors with 3D graphics, including APUs (see also: List of AMD processors with 3D graphics).

Platform			High, standard and low power														Low and ultra-low power								
Codename	Server	Basic						Toronto																	
Codename	Server	Micro																Kyoto							
Codename	Desktop	Performance													Raphael	Phoenix									
Codename	Desktop	Mainstream	Llano	Trinity	Richland	Kaveri	Kaveri Refresh (Godavari)	Carrizo	Bristol Ridge	Raven Ridge	Picasso	Renoir	Cezanne		Raphael	Phoenix									
Codename	Desktop	Entry	Llano	Trinity	Richland	Kaveri	Kaveri Refresh (Godavari)	Carrizo	Bristol Ridge	Raven Ridge	Picasso	Renoir	Cezanne			Phoenix									
Codename	Desktop	Basic																Kabini				Dalí			
Codename	Mobile	Performance										Renoir	Cezanne	Rembrandt	Dragon Range										
Codename	Mobile	Mainstream	Llano	Trinity	Richland	Kaveri		Carrizo	Bristol Ridge	Raven Ridge	Picasso	Renoir Lucienne	Cezanne Barceló	Rembrandt	Dragon Range	Phoenix									
Codename	Mobile	Entry	Llano	Trinity	Richland	Kaveri		Carrizo	Bristol Ridge	Raven Ridge												Dalí			Mendocino
Codename	Mobile	Basic															Desna, Ontario, Zacate	Kabini, Temash	Beema, Mullins	Carrizo-L	Stoney Ridge	Dalí	Pollock		Mendocino
Codename	Embedded			Trinity		Bald Eagle		Merlin Falcon, Brown Falcon		Great Horned Owl		Grey Hawk					Ontario, Zacate	Kabini	Steppe Eagle, Crowned Eagle, LX-Family		Prairie Falcon	Banded Kestrel		River Hawk	
Released			Aug 2011	Oct 2012	Jun 2013	Jan 2014	2015	Jun 2015	Jun 2016	Oct 2017	Jan 2019	Mar 2020	Jan 2021	Jan 2022	Sep 2022	Jan 2023	Jan 2011	May 2013	Apr 2014	May 2015	Feb 2016	Apr 2019	Jul 2020	Jun 2022	Nov 2022
CPU microarchitecture			K10	Piledriver		Steamroller		Excavator	"Excavator+"	Zen	Zen+	Zen 2	Zen 3	Zen 3+	Zen 4		Bobcat	Jaguar	Puma	Puma+	"Excavator+"	Zen		Zen+	"Zen 2+"
ISA			x86-64 v1	x86-64 v2				x86-64 v3							x86-64 v4		x86-64 v1	x86-64 v2			x86-64 v3				
Socket	Desktop	Performance	—N/a												AM5	—N/a	—N/a								
Socket	Desktop	Mainstream	—N/a					AM4						—N/a	AM5	—N/a	—N/a								
Socket	Desktop	Entry	FM1	FM2		FM2+		FM2+ (Note: For FM2+ Excavator models: A8-7680, A6-7480 & Athlon X4 845.), AM4	AM4					—N/a			—N/a								
Socket	Desktop	Basic	—N/a														—N/a	AM1	—N/a			FP5	—N/a		
Socket	Other		FS1	FS1+, FP2		FP3		FP4		FP5		FP6		FP7	FL1	FP7; FP7r2; FP8	FT1	FT3	FT3b		FP4	FP5	FT5	FP5	FT6
PCI Express version			2.0			3.0								4.0	5.0	4.0	2.0				3.0				
CXL			—N/a														—N/a								
Fab. (nm)			GF 32SHP (HKMG SOI)			GF 28SHP (HKMG bulk)				GF 14LPP (FinFET bulk)	GF 12LP (FinFET bulk)	TSMC N7 (FinFET bulk)		TSMC N6 (FinFET bulk)	CCD: TSMC N5 (FinFET bulk) cIOD: TSMC N6 (FinFET bulk)	TSMC 4nm (FinFET bulk)	TSMC N40 (bulk)	TSMC N28 (HKMG bulk)	GF 28SHP (HKMG bulk)			GF 14LPP (FinFET bulk)		GF 12LP (FinFET bulk)	TSMC N6 (FinFET bulk)
Die area (mm^{2})			228	246		245		245	250	210		156	180	210	CCD: (2x) 70 cIOD: 122	178	75 (+ 28 FCH)	107		?	125	149			~100
Min TDP (W)			35	17				12				10		15	65	35	4.5	4	3.95	10	6			12	8
Max APU TDP (W)			100			95		65						45	170	54	18	25					6	54	15
Max stock APU base clock (GHz)			3	3.8	4.1	4.1		3.7	3.8	3.6	3.7	3.8	4.0	3.3	4.7	4.3	1.75	2.2	2	2.2	3.2	2.6	1.2	3.35	2.8
Max APUs per node (Note: A PC would be one node.)			1														1								
Max core dies per CPU			1												2	1	1								
Max CCX per core die			1									2	1				1								
Max cores per CCX			4										8				2	4			2			4	
Max CPU (Note: An APU combines a CPU and a GPU. Both have cores.) cores per APU			4									8			16	8	2	4			2			4	
Max threads per CPU core			1							2							1					2			
Integer pipeline structure			3+3	2+2						4+2		4+2+1	1+3+3+1+2				1+1+1+1				2+2	4+2			4+2+1
i386, i486, i586, CMOV, NOPL, i686, PAE, NX bit, CMPXCHG16B, AMD-V, RVI, ABM, and 64-bit LAHF/SAHF			Yes														Yes								
IOMMU (Note: Requires firmware support.)			—N/a	v2													v1		v2						
BMI1, AES-NI, CLMUL, and F16C			—N/a	Yes													—N/a	Yes							
MOVBE			—N/a					Yes									—N/a	Yes							
AVIC, BMI2, RDRAND, and MWAITX/MONITORX			—N/a					Yes									—N/a				Yes				
SME (Note: Requires firmware support.), TSME, ADX, SHA, RDSEED, SMAP, SMEP, XSAVEC, XSAVES, XRSTORS, CLFLUSHOPT, CLZERO, and PTE Coalescing			—N/a							Yes							—N/a					Yes			
GMET, WBNOINVD, CLWB, QOS, PQE-BW, RDPID, RDPRU, and MCOMMIT			—N/a									Yes					—N/a								Yes
MPK, VAES			—N/a										Yes				—N/a								
SGX			—N/a														—N/a								
FPUs per core			1	0.5						1							1				0.5	1			
Pipes per FPU			2														2								
FPU pipe width			128-bit									256-bit					80-bit	128-bit							256-bit
CPU instruction set SIMD level			SSE4a (Note: No SSE4. No SSSE3.)	AVX				AVX2							AVX-512		SSSE3	AVX			AVX2				
3DNow!			3DNow!+	—N/a													—N/a								
PREFETCH/PREFETCHW			Yes														Yes								
GFNI			—N/a												Yes		—N/a								
AMX			—N/a														—N/a								
FMA4, LWP, TBM, and XOP			—N/a	Yes						—N/a							—N/a				Yes	—N/a			
FMA3			—N/a	Yes													—N/a				Yes				
AMD XDNA			—N/a													Yes	—N/a								
L1 data cache per core (KiB)			64	16				32									32								
L1 data cache associativity (ways)			2	4				8									8								
L1 instruction caches per core			1	0.5						1							1				0.5	1			
Max APU total L1 instruction cache (KiB)			256	128		192				256					512	256	64		128		96	128			
L1 instruction cache associativity (ways)			2			3				4		8					2				3	4			8
L2 caches per core			1	0.5						1							1				0.5	1			
Max APU total L2 cache (MiB)			4					2				4			16		1	2			1			2	
L2 cache associativity (ways)			16							8							16					8			
Max on-die L3 cache per CCX (MiB)			—N/a							4			16		32		—N/a						4		
Max 3D V-Cache per CCD (MiB)			—N/a							—N/a					64	—N/a	—N/a						—N/a		
Max total in-CCD L3 cache per APU (MiB)			—N/a							4		8	16		64		—N/a						4		
Max. total 3D V-Cache per APU (MiB)			—N/a							—N/a					64	—N/a	—N/a						—N/a		
Max. board L3 cache per APU (MiB)			—N/a							—N/a							—N/a						—N/a		
Max total L3 cache per APU (MiB)			—N/a							4		8	16		128		—N/a						4		
APU L3 cache associativity (ways)			—N/a							16							—N/a						16		
L3 cache scheme			—N/a							Victim							—N/a						Victim		
Max. L4 cache			—N/a														—N/a								
Max stock DRAM support			DDR3-1866		DDR3-2133			DDR3-2133, DDR4-2400	DDR4-2400	DDR4-2933		DDR4-3200, LPDDR4-4266		DDR5-4800, LPDDR5-6400	DDR5-5200	DDR5-5600, LPDDR5x-7500	DDR3L-1333	DDR3L-1600	DDR3L-1866		DDR3-1866, DDR4-2400	DDR4-2400	DDR4-1600	DDR4-3200	LPDDR5-5500
Max DRAM channels per APU			2														1					2	1	2	
Max stock DRAM bandwidth (GB/s) per APU			29.866		34.132			38.400		46.932		68.256		102.400	83.200	120.000	10.666	12.800	14.933		19.200	38.400	12.800	51.200	88.000
GPU microarchitecture			TeraScale 2 (VLIW5)	TeraScale 3 (VLIW4)		GCN 2nd gen		GCN 3rd gen		GCN 5th gen				RDNA 2		RDNA 3	TeraScale 2 (VLIW5)	GCN 2nd gen			GCN 3rd gen	GCN 5th gen			RDNA 2
GPU instruction set			TeraScale instruction set			GCN instruction set								RDNA instruction set			TeraScale instruction set	GCN instruction set							RDNA instruction set
Max stock GPU base clock (MHz)			600	800	844	866		1108		1250	1400	2100		2400	400		538	600	?	847	900	1200	600	1300	1900
Max stock GPU base GFLOPS (Note: Single-precision performance is calculated from the base (or boost) core clock speed based on a FMA operation.)			480	614.4	648.1	886.7		1134.5		1760	1971.2	2150.4		3686.4	102.4		86	?	?	?	345.6	460.8	230.4	1331.2	486.4
3D engine (Note: Unified shaders : texture mapping units : render output units)			Up to 400:20:8	Up to 384:24:6		Up to 512:32:8				Up to 704:44:16		Up to 512:32:8		768:48:8	128:8:4		80:8:4	128:8:4			Up to 192:12:8	Up to 192:12:4	192:12:4	Up to 512:?:?	128:?:?
3D engine			IOMMUv1			IOMMUv2											IOMMUv1		?		IOMMUv2				
Video decoder			UVD 3.0			UVD 4.2		UVD 6.0		VCN 1.0		VCN 2.1	VCN 2.2	VCN 3.1		?	UVD 3.0	UVD 4.0	UVD 4.2		UVD 6.2	VCN 1.0			VCN 3.1
Video encoder			—N/a	VCE 1.0		VCE 2.0		VCE 3.1		VCN 1.0		VCN 2.1	VCN 2.2	VCN 3.1		?	—N/a	VCE 2.0			VCE 3.4	VCN 1.0			VCN 3.1
AMD Fluid Motion			No			Yes				No							No		Yes			No			
GPU power saving			PowerPlay	PowerTune													PowerPlay	PowerTune							
TrueAudio			—N/a			Yes							?				—N/a	Yes							
FreeSync			—N/a			1; 2											—N/a	1; 2							
HDCP (Note: To play protected video content, it also requires card, operating system, driver, and application support. A compatible HDCP display is also needed for this. HDCP is mandatory for the output of certain audio formats, placing additional constraints on the multimedia setup.)			?			1.4				2.2				2.3			?	1.4				2.2			2.3
PlayReady			—N/a							3.0 not yet							—N/a					3.0 not yet			
Supported displays (Note: To feed more than two displays, the additional panels must have native DisplayPort support. Alternatively active DisplayPort-to-DVI/HDMI/VGA adapters can be employed.)			2–3	2–4				3		3 (desktop); 4 (mobile, embedded)		4					2				3	4		4	
/drm/radeon (Note: DRM (Direct Rendering Manager) is a component of the Linux kernel. Support in this table refers to the most current version.)			Yes						—N/a								Yes				—N/a				
/drm/amdgpu			—N/a			Yes											—N/a	Yes							

== Software support ==
Support for the Eyefinity display controller is available in the Linux kernel device driver amdgpu and accessible via the DRM/KMS API.

AMD Catalyst supports Eyefinity and enables the user to independently configure and run each attached displays. It facilitates the configuration of "cloned mode", i.e. to copy one desktop onto multiple screens or "extended mode", i.e. to span the workspace across multiple screens and combine the resolutions of all of those displays into one big resolution. AMD calls the extended modes Single Large Surface (SLS) and Catalyst support of certain range of display group configurations. For example, 5x1 landscape and 5x1 portrait are supported since AMD Catalyst version 11.10 from October 2011.

Starting in Catalyst 14.6, AMD supports mixed resolution support, so a single Eyefinity display group can drive each monitor at a different resolution. This is provided through two new Eyefinity display modes, Fit and Expand, in addition to the existing Fill mode. In Fit or Expand mode, AMD compensates for mismatched resolutions by creating a virtual desktop of a different resolution than the monitors, and then either padding it out or cropping it as is necessary.

AMD Eyefinity works with games that support non-standard aspect ratios, which is required for panning across multiple displays. SLS ("Single Large Surface") mode requires an identical display resolution on all configured displays. AMD validated some video games to support Eyefinity. The short list includes titles such as Age of Conan, ARMA 2: Operation Arrowhead, S.T.A.L.K.E.R.: Call of Pripyat, Serious Sam 3: BFE, Singularity, Sleeping Dogs, Assassin's Creed II, Sniper Elite V2, Soldier of Fortune Online, Tom Clancy's Splinter Cell: Conviction, Star Wars: The Force Unleashed 2, Marvel Super Hero Squad Online, R.U.S.E., Supreme Commander 2, among others. However, some games not on this short list seem to work as well, e.g. Dirt 3 and The Elder Scrolls V: Skyrim.

KMS driver supports AMD Eyefinity.

== See also ==
- AMD FireMV – pre-Eyefinity products for multi-monitor set-ups
