= AMD FireMV =

Brand name by AMD

AMD FireMV, formerly ATI FireMV, is brand name for graphics cards marketed as a multi-display 2D video card, with 3D capabilities same as the low-end Radeon graphics products. It competes directly with Matrox professional video cards. FireMV cards aims at the corporate environment who require several displays attached to a single computer. FireMV cards has options of dual GPU, a total of four display output via a VHDCI connector, or single GPU, a total of two display output via a DMS-59 connector.

FireMV cards are available for PCI and PCI Express interfaces.

Although these are marketed by ATI as mainly 2D cards, the FireMV 2250 cards support OpenGL 2.0 since it is based on the RV516 GPU found in the Radeon X1000 series released 2005.

The FireMV 2260 is the first video card to carry dual DisplayPort output in the workstation 2D graphics market, sporting DirectX 10.1 support.

== Chipset table ==
Configuration	Dual output		Quad output	
Configuration	FireMV 2260 Multi-View	FireMV 2270 Multi-View	FireMV 2450 Multi-View	FireMV 2460 Multi-View
Display outputs	dual DisplayPort	dual DisplayPort, DVI, VGA	Quad DVI and VGA	quad DisplayPort and quad DVI
Display connections	2 × DisplayPort	DMS-59	2 × VHDCI	4 × Mini DisplayPort
Graphics memory	256MiB	512MiB or 1GiB	512MiB	512MiB
Max. resolution	2560×1600	2560×1600	1920×1200	2560×1600

== See also ==
- AMD Eyefinity – introduced with Radeon HD 5000 series in September 2009
- List of AMD graphics processing units
