= Radeon HD 5000 series =

Series of video cards

ATI Radeon HD 5000 series
- Release date: September 10, 2009; 17 years ago
- Codename: Evergreen; Manhattan
- Architecture: TeraScale 2
- Transistors: 292M 40 nm (Cedar); 627M 40 nm (Redwood); 1.040M 40 nm (Juniper); 2.154M 40 nm (Cypress); 2x 2.154M 40 nm (Hemlock)

Cards
- Entry-level: 5450; 5550; 5570
- Mid-range: 5670; 5750; 5770
- High-end: 5830; 5850; 5870
- Enthusiast: 5970

API support
- Direct3D: Direct3D 11 (feature level 11_0); Shader Model 5.0
- OpenCL: OpenCL 1.2
- OpenGL: OpenGL 4.5

History
- Predecessor: Radeon HD 4000 series
- Successor: Radeon HD 6000 series

Support status
- Unsupported

The Evergreen series is a family of GPUs developed by Advanced Micro Devices for its Radeon line under the ATI brand name. It was employed in Radeon HD 5000 graphics card series and competed directly with NVIDIA's GeForce 400 series.

== Release ==
The existence was spotted on a presentation slide from AMD Technology Analyst Day July 2007 as "R8xx". AMD held a press event in the USS Hornet Museum on September 10, 2009 and announced ATI Eyefinity multi-display technology and specifications of the Radeon HD 5800 series' variants. The first variants of the Radeon HD 5800 series were launched September 23, 2009, with the HD 5700 series launching October 12 and HD 5970 launching on November 18. The HD 5670, was launched on January 14, 2010, and the HD 5500 and 5400 series were launched in February 2010, completing what has appeared to be most of AMD's Evergreen GPU lineup.

Demand so greatly outweighed supply that more than two months after launch, many online retailers were still having trouble keeping the 5800 and 5900 series in stock.

== Architecture ==
This article is about all products under the Radeon HD 5000 series brand. TeraScale 2 was introduced with this.

- Radeon HD 5830 and above products，have the capability to calculate double-precision floating-point format.
- Radeon HD 5770 and below products，have the capability to calculate only single-precision floating-point format.
- OpenGL 4.x compliance requires supporting FP64 shaders. These are implemented by emulation on some TeraScale (microarchitecture) GPUs.

=== Multi-monitor support ===
The on-die display controllers with the new brand name ATI Eyefinity were introduced with the Radeon HD 5000 series. The entire HD 5000 series products have Eyefinity capabilities supporting three outputs. The Radeon HD 5870 Eyefinity Edition, however, supports six mini DisplayPort outputs, all of which can be simultaneously active.

Display pipeline supports xvYCC gamut and 12-bit per component output via HDMI. HDMI 1.3a output. The previous generation Radeon R700 GPUs in the Radeon HD 4000 series only support up to LPCM 7.1 audio and no bitstream output support for Dolby TrueHD and DTS-HD Master Audio audio formats to external decoders. This feature is now supported on Evergreen family GPUs. On Evergreen family GPUs, DisplayPort outputs on board are capable of 10-bit per component output, and HDMI output is capable of 12-bit per component output.

Maximum output configurations for normal Radeon HD 5800/5700 series cards
	DVI-I/VGA	DVI-I/VGA	HDMI	DisplayPort
Option 1	Active	Active	Inactive	Active
Option 2	Active	Inactive	Active	Active

=== Video acceleration ===
Unified Video Decoder (UVD2.2) is present on the dies of all products and supported by AMD Catalyst 9.11 and later through DXVA 2.0 on Microsoft Windows and VDPAU on Linux and FreeBSD. The free and open-source graphics device driver#ATI/AMD also support UVD.

=== OpenCL (API) ===
OpenCL accelerates many scientific software packages up to a factor 10 or 100 and more, compared to contemporary CPUs. OpenCL 1.0 to 1.2 are supported for all TeraScale 2 and 3 chips.

== Radeon Feature Table ==
The following table shows features of AMD/ATI's GPUs (see also: List of AMD graphics processing units).

Name of GPU series	Wonder	Mach	3D Rage	Rage Pro	Rage 128	R100	R200	R300	R400	R500	R600	RV670	R700	Evergreen	Northern Islands		Southern Islands	Sea Islands	Volcanic Islands	Arctic Islands/Polaris	Vega	Navi 1x	Navi 2x	Navi 3x	Navi 4x
Released	1986	1991	Apr; 1996	Mar; 1997	Aug; 1998	Apr; 2000	Aug; 2001	Sep; 2002	May; 2004	Oct; 2005	May; 2007	Nov; 2007	Jun; 2008	Sep; 2009	Oct; 2010	Dec; 2010	Jan; 2012	Sep; 2013	Jun; 2015	Jun 2016, Apr 2017, Aug 2019	Jun 2017, Feb 2019	Jul; 2019	Nov; 2020	Dec; 2022	Feb; 2025
Marketing Name	Wonder	Mach	3D; Rage	Rage; Pro	Rage; 128	Radeon; 7000	Radeon; 8000	Radeon; 9000	Radeon; X700/X800	Radeon; X1000	Radeon; HD 2000	Radeon; HD 3000	Radeon; HD 4000	Radeon; HD 5000	Radeon; HD 6000		Radeon; HD 7000	Radeon; 200	Radeon; 300	Radeon; 400/500/600	Radeon; RX Vega, Radeon VII	Radeon; RX 5000	Radeon; RX 6000	Radeon; RX 7000	Radeon; RX 9000
AMD support	Ended																			Current					
Kind	2D		3D																						
Instruction set architecture	Not publicly known									Multiple (Note: R500 has two instruction sets. Vertex shader cores: "PVS instruction set". Pixel shader cores: "US instruction set".)	TeraScale instruction set						GCN instruction set					RDNA instruction set			
Microarchitecture	Not publicly known					GFX1		GFX2			TeraScale 1 (VLIW5) (GFX3)			TeraScale 2 (VLIW5) (GFX4)	TeraScale 2 (VLIW5) up to 68xx (GFX4)	TeraScale 3 (VLIW4) in 69xx (GFX5)	GCN 1st gen (GFX6)	GCN 2nd gen (GFX7)	GCN 3rd gen (GFX8)	GCN 4th gen (GFX8)	GCN 5th gen (GFX9)	RDNA (GFX10.1)	RDNA 2 (GFX10.3)	RDNA 3 (GFX11)	RDNA 4 (GFX12)
Type	Fixed pipeline (Note: The Radeon R100 Series has programmable pixel shaders, but do not fully comply with DirectX 8 or Pixel Shader 1.0. See article on R100's pixel shaders.)						Programmable pixel & vertex pipelines				Unified shader model														
Direct3D	—N/a		5.0	6.0		7.0	8.1	9.0; 11 (9_2)	9.0b 11 (9_2)	9.0c 11 (9_3)	10.0; 11 (10_0)	10.1; 11 (10_1)		11 (11_0)			11 (11_1); 12 (11_1)	11 (12_0); 12 (12_0)			11 (12_1); 12 (12_1)		11 (12_1); 12 (12_2)		
Shader model	—N/a						1.4	2.0+	2.0b	3.0	4.0	4.1		5.0			5.1	5.1; 6.5			6.7				6.8
OpenGL	—N/a			1.1	1.2	1.3		1.5 (Note: R300, R400 and R500 based cards do not fully comply with OpenGL 2+ as the hardware does not support all types of non-power of two (NPOT) textures.)			3.3			4.5 (Windows), 4.6 (Linux Mesa 25.2+)			4.6 (Note: OpenGL 4+ compliance requires supporting FP64 shaders and these are emulated on some TeraScale chips using 32-bit hardware.)								
Vulkan	—N/a															1.1 (Note: Vulkan support is theoretically possible but has not been implemented in a stable driver.)	1.3 (Note: Vulkan support in Linux relies on the AMDgpu kernel driver, the radeon driver does not support Vulkan.)		1.4						
OpenCL	—N/a										Close to Metal		1.1 (not supported by Mesa)	1.2+ (on Linux: 1.1+ (no Image support on Clover, with Rusticl) with Mesa, 1.2+ on GCN 1.Gen)				2.0+ (Adrenalin driver on Win 7+) (on Linux ROCm, Mesa 1.2+ (no support in Clover, only Rusticl, Mesa, 2.0+ and 3.0 with AMD drivers or AMD ROCm), 5th gen: 2.2 win 10+ and Linux RocM 5.0+				2.2+ and 3.0 Windows 8.1+ and Linux ROCm 5.0+ (Mesa Rusticl 1.2+ and 3.0 (2.1+ and 2.2+))			
HSA / ROCm	—N/a																Yes					?			
Video decoding ASIC	—N/a										Avivo/UVD	UVD+	UVD 2	UVD 2.2	UVD 3		UVD 4	UVD 4.2	UVD 5.0 or 6.0	UVD 6.3	UVD 7 (Note: The UVD and VCE were replaced by the Video Core Next (VCN) ASIC in the Raven Ridge APU implementation of Vega.)	VCN 2.0	VCN 3.0	VCN 4.0	VCN 5.0
Video encoding ASIC	—N/a																VCE 1.0	VCE 2.0	VCE 3.0 or 3.1	VCE 3.4	VCE 4.0	VCN 2.0	VCN 3.0	VCN 4.0	VCN 5.0
Fluid Motion (Note: Video processing for video frame rate interpolation technique. In Windows it works as a DirectShow filter in your player. In Linux, there is no support on the part of drivers and / or community.)	No																	Yes				No		?	
Power saving	?										PowerPlay				PowerTune		PowerTune & ZeroCore Power					?			
TrueAudio	—N/a																	Via dedicated DSP		Via shaders					
FreeSync	—N/a																	1; 2							
HDCP (Note: To play protected video content, it also requires card, operating system, driver, and application support. A compatible HDCP display is also needed for this. HDCP is mandatory for the output of certain audio formats, placing additional constraints on the multimedia setup.)	—N/a										?							1.4		2.2		2.3			
PlayReady	—N/a																			3.0	No	3.0			
Supported displays (Note: More displays may be supported with native DisplayPort connections, or splitting the maximum resolution between multiple monitors with active converters.)						1–2	2							2–6								?			4
Max. resolution	?													2–6 × 2560×1600			2–6 × 4096×2160 @ 30 Hz			2–6 × 5120×2880 @ 60 Hz	3 × 7680×4320 @ 60 Hz	7680×4320 @ 60 Hz PowerColor		7680x4320 @165 Hz	7680x4320
/drm/radeon (Note: DRM (Direct Rendering Manager) is a component of the Linux kernel. AMDgpu is the Linux kernel module. Support in this table refers to the most current version.)						Yes													—N/a						
/drm/amdgpu	—N/a																Yes Kernel 6.19+		Yes						

== Desktop products ==
Model	Launch	Code name	Fab (nm)	Transistors (million)	Die size (mm^{2})	Bus interface	Clock rate		Core config (Note: Unified shaders : Texture mapping units : Render output units)	Fillrate		Memory				Processing power (GFLOPS)		TDP (Watts) (Note: The TDP is reference design TDP values from AMD. Different non-reference board designs from vendors may lead to slight variations in actual TDP.)		CrossFire support	API support (version)			Release price (USD)
Model	Launch	Code name	Fab (nm)	Transistors (million)	Die size (mm^{2})	Bus interface	Core (MHz)	Memory (MHz)	Core config	Pixel (GP/s)	Texture (GT/s)	Size (MB)	Bandwidth (GB/s)	Bus type	Bus width (Bit)	Single precision	Double precision	Idle	Max.	CrossFire support	Direct3D	OpenGL	OpenCL	Release price (USD)
Radeon HD 5450	Feb 4, 2010	Cedar	40	292	59	PCIe 2.1 x16 PCI; PCIe 2.1 x1	650; 650; 650	400; 800; 800	80:8:4	2.6	5.2	512; 1024; 2048	6.4; 12.8	DDR2; DDR3	64	104	—N/a	6.4	19.1	No	11.3 (11 0)	4.5	1.2	~50
Radeon HD 5550	Feb 9, 2010	Redwood LE	40	627	104	PCIe 2.1 x16	550; 550; 550	400; 800; 800	320:16:8	4.4	8.8	512; 1024; 2048	12.8; 25.6; 51.2	DDR2; GDDR3; GDDR5	128	352	—N/a	10	39	No	11.3 (11 0)	4.5	1.2	~70
Radeon HD 5570	Feb 9, 2010	Redwood PRO	40	627	104	PCIe 2.1 x16	650; 650	400; 900	400:20:8	5.2	13.0	512; 1024; 2048	12.8; 28.8; 57.6	DDR2; GDDR3; GDDR5	128	520	—N/a	10	39	No	11.3 (11 0)	4.5	1.2	80
Radeon HD 5610	May 14, 2011	Redwood PRO	40	627	104	PCIe 2.1 x16	650	500	400:20:8	5.2	13.0	1024	16.0	GDDR3	128	520	—N/a	?	39	No	11.3 (11 0)	4.5	1.2	?
Radeon HD 5670	Jan 14, 2010	Redwood XT	40	627	104	PCIe 2.1 x16	775; 775	800; 1000	400:20:8	6.2	15.5	512; 1024; 2048	25.6; 64.0	GDDR3; GDDR5	128	620	—N/a	15	64	4-way CrossFire	11.3 (11 0)	4.5	1.2	99
Radeon HD 5750	Oct 13, 2009	Juniper PRO	40	1040	170	PCIe 2.1 x16	700; 700	1150; 1150	720:36:16	11.2	25.2	512; 1024	73.6	GDDR5	128	1008	—N/a	16	86	4-way CrossFire	11.3 (11 0)	4.5	1.2	129
Radeon HD 5770	Oct 13, 2009	Juniper XT	40	1040	170	PCIe 2.1 x16	850; 850	1200; 1200	800:40:16	13.6	34.0	512; 1024	76.8	GDDR5	128	1360	—N/a	18	108	4-way CrossFire	11.3 (11 0)	4.5	1.2	159
Radeon HD 5830	Feb 25, 2010	Cypress LE	40	2154	334	PCIe 2.1 x16	800	1000	1120:56:16	12.8	44.8	1024	128.0	GDDR5	256	1792	358.4	25	175	4-way CrossFire	11.3 (11 0)	4.5	1.2	239
Radeon HD 5850	Sep 30, 2009	Cypress PRO	40	2154	334	PCIe 2.1 x16	725; 725	1000; 1000	1440:72:32	23.2	52.2	1024; 2048	128.0	GDDR5	256	2088	417.6	27	151	4-way CrossFire	11.3 (11 0)	4.5	1.2	259
Radeon HD 5870	Sep 23, 2009	Cypress XT	40	2154	334	PCIe 2.1 x16	850; 850	1200; 1200	1600:80:32	27.2	68.0	1024; 2048	153.6	GDDR5	256	2720	544	27	188; 228	4-way CrossFire	11.3 (11 0)	4.5	1.2	379
Radeon HD 5870 Eyefinity Edition (Note: All chips feature AMD Eyefinity, but the Radeon HD 5870 Eyefinity Edition card also have six mini DisplayPort outputs, all of which can be simultaneously active.)	Mar 11, 2010	Cypress XT	40	2154	334	PCIe 2.1 x16	850	1200	1600:80:32	27.2	68.0	2048	153.6	GDDR5	256	2720	544	27	228	4-way CrossFire	11.3 (11 0)	4.5	1.2	479
Radeon HD 5970	Nov 18, 2009	Hemlock	40	2154×2	334×2	PCIe 2.1 x16	725; 725	1000; 1000	1600:80:32×2	46.4	116.0	1024×2; 2048×2	128×2	GDDR5	256×2	4640	928	51	294	2-way CrossFire	11.3 (11 0)	4.5	1.2	599

=== Radeon HD 5900 ===
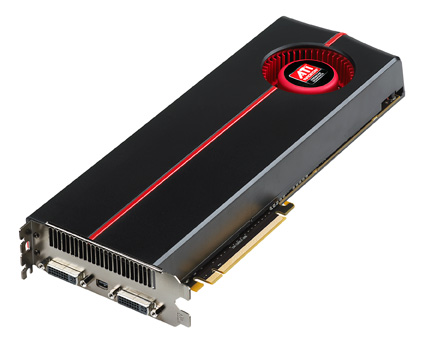
ATI Radeon HD 5970

Codenamed Hemlock, the Radeon HD 5900 series was announced on October 12, 2009, starting with the HD 5970. The Radeon HD 5900 series utilizes two Cypress graphics processors and a third-party PCI-E bridge. Similar to Radeon HD 4800 X2 series graphics cards; however, AMD has abandoned the use of X2 moniker for dual-GPU variants starting with Radeon HD 5900 series, making it the only series within the Evergreen GPU family to have two GPUs on one PCB.

=== Radeon HD 5800 ===
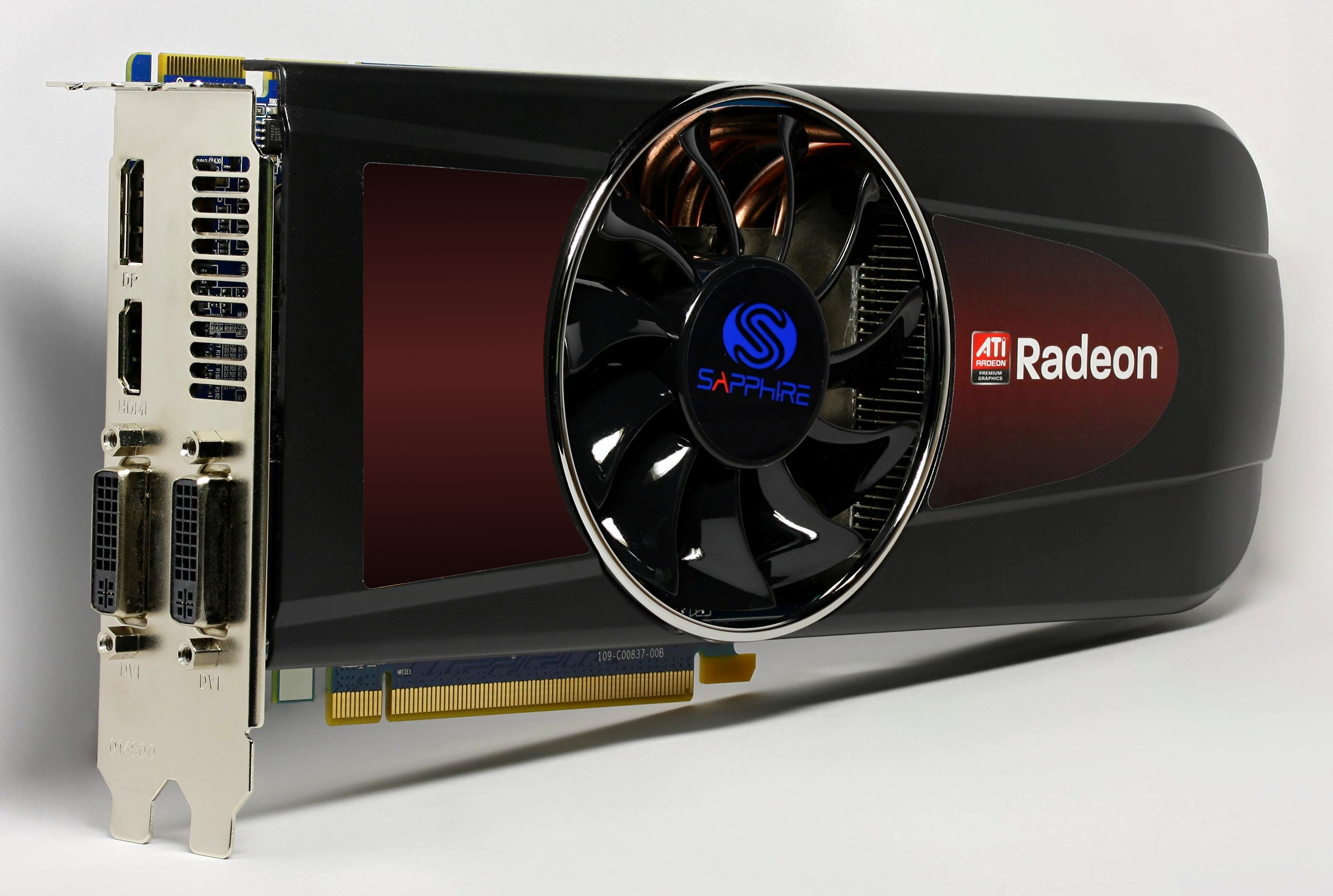
A Radeon HD 5870 by Sapphire Technology

Codenamed Cypress, the Radeon HD 5800 series was announced on September 23, 2009. Products included Radeon HD 5850 and Radeon HD 5870. The launching model of Radeon HD 5870 can support three display outputs at most, and one of these has to support DisplayPort. In terms of overall performance, the 5870 comes in between the GTX 470 and GTX 480 from rival company Nvidia, being closer to the GTX 480 than the GTX 470. An Eyefinity 6 edition of Radeon HD 5870 was released, with 2 GiB GDDR5 memory, supporting six simultaneous displays, all to be connected to one of the mini DisplayPort outputs and all supporting this connection natively to not require additional hardware. The Radeon HD 5870 has 1600 usable shader processors, while the Radeon HD 5850 has 1,440 usable stream cores, as 160 out of the 1,600 total cores are disabled during product binning which detects potentially defective areas of the chip. A Radeon HD 5830 was released on February 25, 2010. The Radeon HD 5830 has 1,120 usable stream cores and a standard core clock of 800 MHz.

=== Radeon HD 5700 ===
The codename for the 5700 GPU was Juniper and it was exactly half of Cypress. Half the shader engines, half the memory controllers, half the ROPs, half the TMUs, half everything. The 5750 had one shader engine disabled (of 10), so had 720 stream processors, while the 5770 had all ten enabled. Additionally, the 5750 ran at 700 MHz and a lower voltage, while the 5770 used more power, but ran at 850 MHz. Both cards were normally found with 1 GB of GDDR5 memory, but 512 MB variants did exist, performance suffering somewhat.

=== Radeon HD 5600 ===
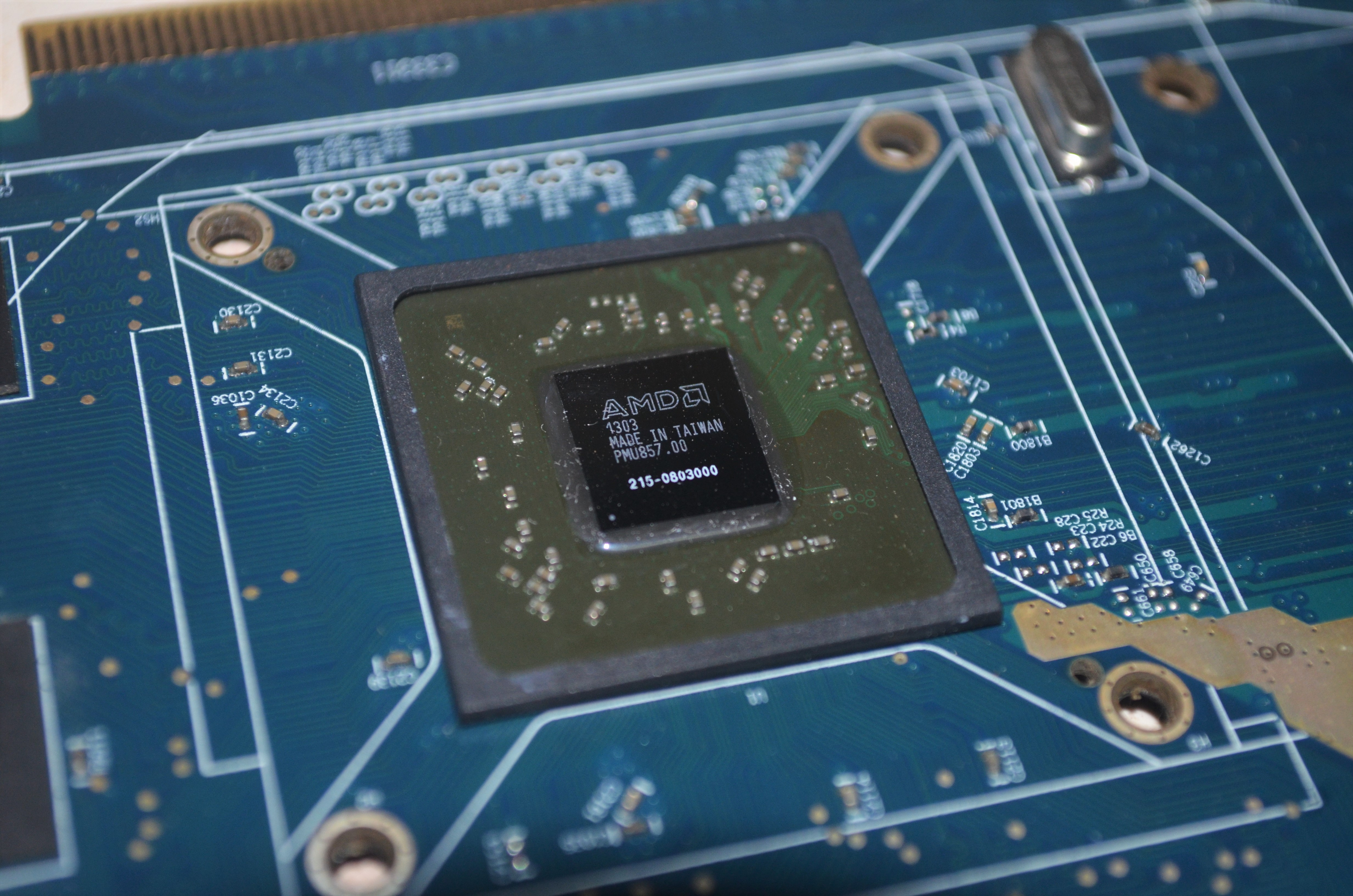
HD 5670 card heat-sink removed

Codenamed Redwood XT, the 5600 series has all five of Redwood's shader engines enabled. As each of them has 80 VLIW-5 units, this gave it 400 stream processors. Reference clocks were 775 MHz for all 5600s, while memory clocks varied between OEMs, as did the use of DDR3 and GDDR5 memory, the latter being twice as fast.

=== Radeon HD 5500 ===
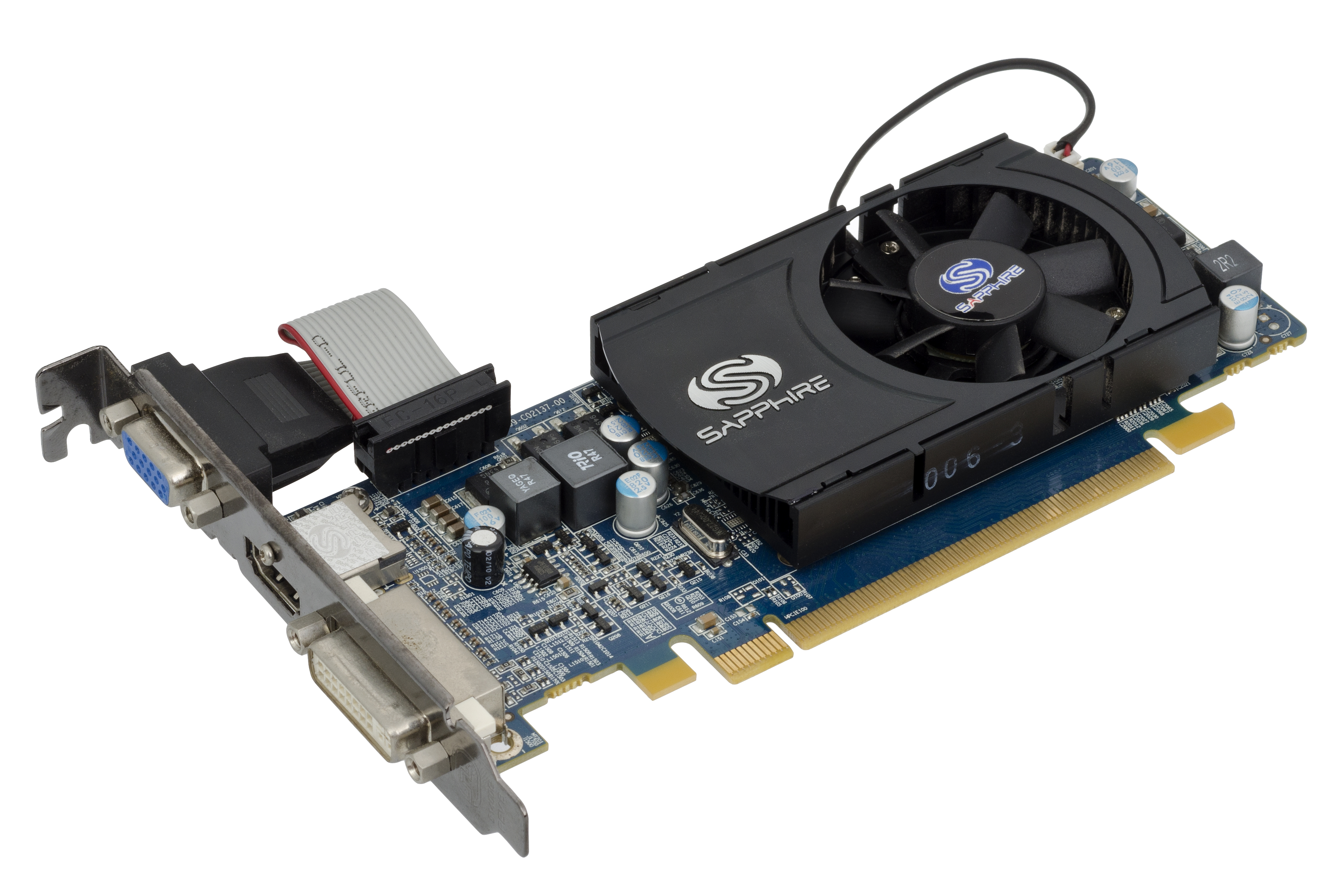
A low-profile HD 5570 card

The Radeon HD 5570 was released on February 9, 2010, using the Redwood XT GPU as seen in the 5600 series. At first release was limited to DDR3 memory, but later, ATI added support for GDDR5 memory. One more variant, with only 320 stream cores, is available and Radeon HD 5550 was suggested as the product name. 5570s and 5550s were available with GDDR5, GDDR3 and DDR2 memory. The 5550 variant disabled one shader engine, so had only 320 stream processors (4 engines, 80 VLIW-5 units each).

All reference board designs of the Radeon HD 5500 series are half-height, making them suitable for a low profile form factor chassis.

=== Radeon HD 5400 ===
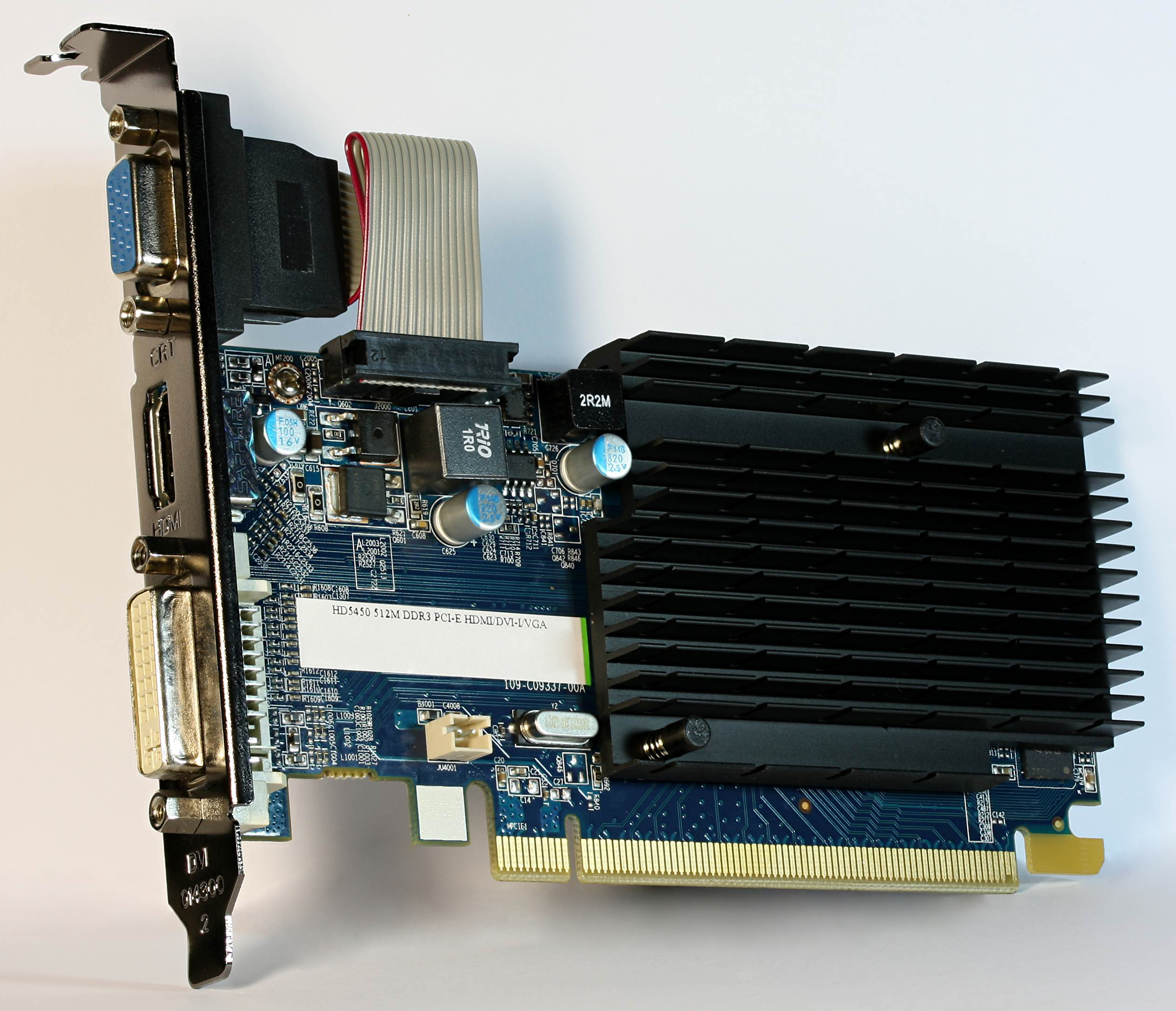
A Radeon HD 5450 by Sapphire Technology

Codenamed Cedar, the Radeon HD 5400 series was announced on February 4, 2010, starting with the HD 5450. The Radeon HD 5450 has 80 stream cores, a core clock of 650 MHz, and 800 MHz DDR2 or DDR3 memory. The 5400 series is designed to assume a low-profile card size. Some vendors created a PCI version of 5450 making this the last PCI Video card.

== Graphics device drivers ==
=== AMD's proprietary graphics device driver "Catalyst" ===
AMD Catalyst is being developed for Microsoft Windows and Linux. As of July 2014, other operating systems are not officially supported. This may be different for the AMD FirePro brand, which is based on identical hardware but features OpenGL-certified graphics device drivers.

AMD Catalyst supports of course all features advertised for the Radeon brand.

=== Free and open-source graphics device driver "Radeon" ===
The free and open-source drivers are primarily developed on Linux and for Linux, but have been ported to other operating systems as well. On HD5000, the driver using following six parts:

1. Linux kernel component DRM
2. Linux kernel component KMS driver: basically the device driver for the display controller in kernel, called "radeon".
3. user-space component libDRM: basically one of 3d drivers. The HD5000 series are using the "r600g" driver.
4. user-space component in Mesa 3D;
5. a special and distinct 2D graphics device driver for X.Org Server; with this card, EXA is used instead of Glamor

The free and open-source "Radeon" graphics driver supports most of the features implemented into the Radeon line of GPUs.

The free and open-source "Radeon" graphics device drivers are not reverse engineered, but based on documentation released by AMD.

== See also ==
- AMD FirePro
- AMD FireMV
- AMD FireStream
- List of AMD graphics processing units
