= Radeon X1000 series =

GPU series by ATI Technologies

ATI Radeon X1000 series
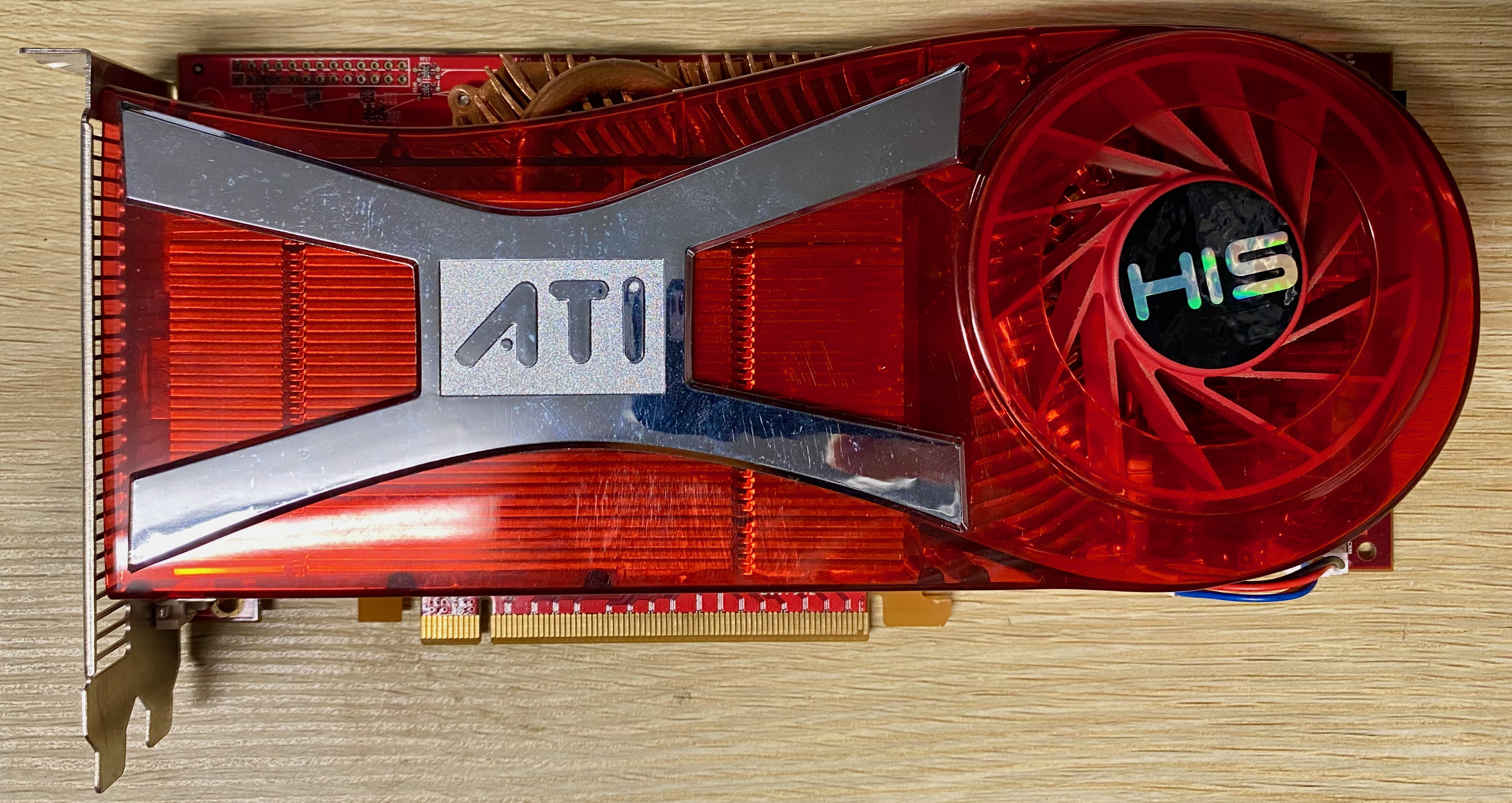
- ATI Radeon X1950XTX
- Release date: October 5, 2005; 21 years ago
- Codename: Fudo (R520); Rodin (R580)
- Architecture: Radeon R500
- Transistors: 107M 90nm (RV505): 107M 90nm (RV515); 105M 90nm (RV516); 157M 90nm (RV530); 312M 90nm (R520); 384M 90nm (R580); 384M 90nm (R580+); 157M 80nm (RV535); 312M 80nm (RV560); 312M 80nm (RV570)

Cards
- Entry-level: X1300, X1350, X1550
- Mid-range: X1600, X1650
- High-end: X1800, X1900
- Enthusiast: X1950

API support
- Direct3D: Direct3D 9.0c Shader Model 3.0
- OpenGL: OpenGL 2.0

History
- Predecessor: Radeon X800 series
- Successor: Radeon HD 2000 series

Support status
- Unsupported

The R520 (codenamed Fudo) is a graphics processing unit (GPU) developed by ATI Technologies and produced by TSMC. It was the first GPU produced using a 90 nm photolithography process.

The R520 is the foundation for a line of DirectX 9.0c and OpenGL 2.0 3D accelerator X1000 video cards. It is ATI's first major architectural overhaul since the R300 and is highly optimized for Shader Model 3.0. The Radeon X1000 series using the core was introduced on October 5, 2005, and competed primarily against Nvidia's GeForce 7 series. ATI released the successor to the R500 series with the R600 series on May 14, 2007.

ATI does not provide official support for any X1000 series cards for Windows 8 or Windows 10; the last AMD Catalyst for this generation is the 10.2 from 2010 up to Windows 7. AMD stopped providing drivers for Windows 7 for this series in 2015.

A series of open source Radeon drivers are available when using a Linux distribution.

The same GPUs are also found in some AMD FireMV products targeting multi-monitor set-ups.

== Delay during the development ==
The Radeon X1800 video cards that included an R520 were released with a delay of several months because ATI engineers discovered a bug within the GPU in a very late stage of development. This bug, caused by a faulty 3rd party 90 nm chip design library, greatly hampered clock speed ramping, so they had to "respin" the chip for another revision (a new GDSII had to be sent to TSMC). The problem had been almost random in how it affected the prototype chips, making it difficult to identify.

== Architecture ==
The R520 architecture is referred to by ATI as an "Ultra Threaded Dispatch Processor", which refers to ATI's plan to boost the efficiency of their GPU, instead of going with a brute force increase in the number of processing units. A central pixel shader "dispatch unit" breaks shaders down into threads (batches) of 16 pixels (4×4) and can track and distribute up to 128 threads per pixel "quad" (4 pipelines each). When a shader quad becomes idle due to a completion of a task or waiting for other data, the dispatch engine assigns the quad with another task to do in the meantime. The overall result is theoretically a greater utilization of the shader units. With a large number of threads per quad, ATI created a very large processor register array that is capable of multiple concurrent reads and writes, and has a high-bandwidth connection to each shader array, providing the temporary storage necessary to keep the pipelines fed by having work available as much as possible. With chips such as RV530 and R580, where the number of shader units per pipeline triples, the efficiency of pixel shading drops off slightly because these shaders still have the same level of threading resources as the less endowed RV515 and R520.

The next major change to the core is to its memory bus. R420 and R300 had nearly identical memory controller designs, with the former being a bug fixed release designed for higher clock speeds. R520's memory bus differs with its central controller (arbiter) that connects to the "memory clients". Around the chip are two 256-bit ring buses running at the same speed as the DRAM chips, but in opposite directions to reduce latency. Along these ring buses are four "stop" points where data exits the ring and goes into or out of the memory chips. There is a fifth, significantly less complex stop that is designed for the PCI Express interface and video input. This design allows memory accesses to be quicker though lower latency from the smaller distance the signals need to move through the GPU, and by increasing the number of banks per DRAM. The chip can spread out memory requests faster and more directly to the RAM chips. ATI claimed a 40% improvement in efficiency over older designs. Smaller cores such as RV515 and RV530 received cutbacks due to their smaller, less costly designs. RV530, for example, has two internal 128-bit buses instead. This generation has support for all recent memory types, including GDDR4. In addition to a ring bus, each memory channel has the granularity of 32-bits, which improves memory efficiency when performing small memory requests.

The vertex shader engines were already at the required FP32 precision in ATI's older products. Changes necessary for SM3.0 included longer instruction lengths, dynamic flow control instructions, with branches, loops and subroutines and a larger temporary register space. The pixel shader engines are actually quite similar in computational layout to their R420 counterparts, although they were heavily optimized and tweaked to reach high clock speeds on the 90 nm process. ATI has been working for years on a high-performance shader compiler in their driver for their older hardware, so staying with a similar basic design that is compatible offered obvious cost and time savings.

At the end of the pipeline, the texture addressing processors are decoupled from pixel shaders, so any unused texturing units can be dynamically allocated to pixels that need more texture layers. Other improvements include 4096x4096 texture support and ATI's 3Dc normal map compression saw an improvement in compression ratio for more specific situations.

The R5xx family introduced a more advanced onboard motion-video engine. Like the Radeon cards since the R100, the R5xx can offload almost the entire MPEG-1/2 video pipeline. The R5xx can also assist in Microsoft WMV9/VC-1 and MPEG H.264/AVC decoding, by a combination of the 3D/pipeline's shader-units and the motion-video engine. Benchmarks show only a modest decrease in CPU-utilization for VC-1 and H.264 playback.

A selection of real-time 3D demonstration programs was released at launch. ATI's development of their "digital superstar", Ruby, continued with a new demo named The Assassin. It showcased a highly complex environment, with high-dynamic-range lighting (HDR) and dynamic soft shadows. Ruby's latest competing program, Cyn, was composed of 120,000 polygons.

The cards support dual-link DVI output and HDCP. However, using HDCP requires external ROM to be installed, which were not available for early models of the video cards. RV515, RV530, and RV535 cores include a single and a double DVI link; R520, RV560, RV570, R580, R580+ cores include two double DVI links.

AMD released the final Radeon R5xx Acceleration document.

== Drivers ==
The last AMD Catalyst version that officially supports the X1000 series is 10.2, display driver version 8.702.

== Variants ==
=== X1300–X1550 series ===
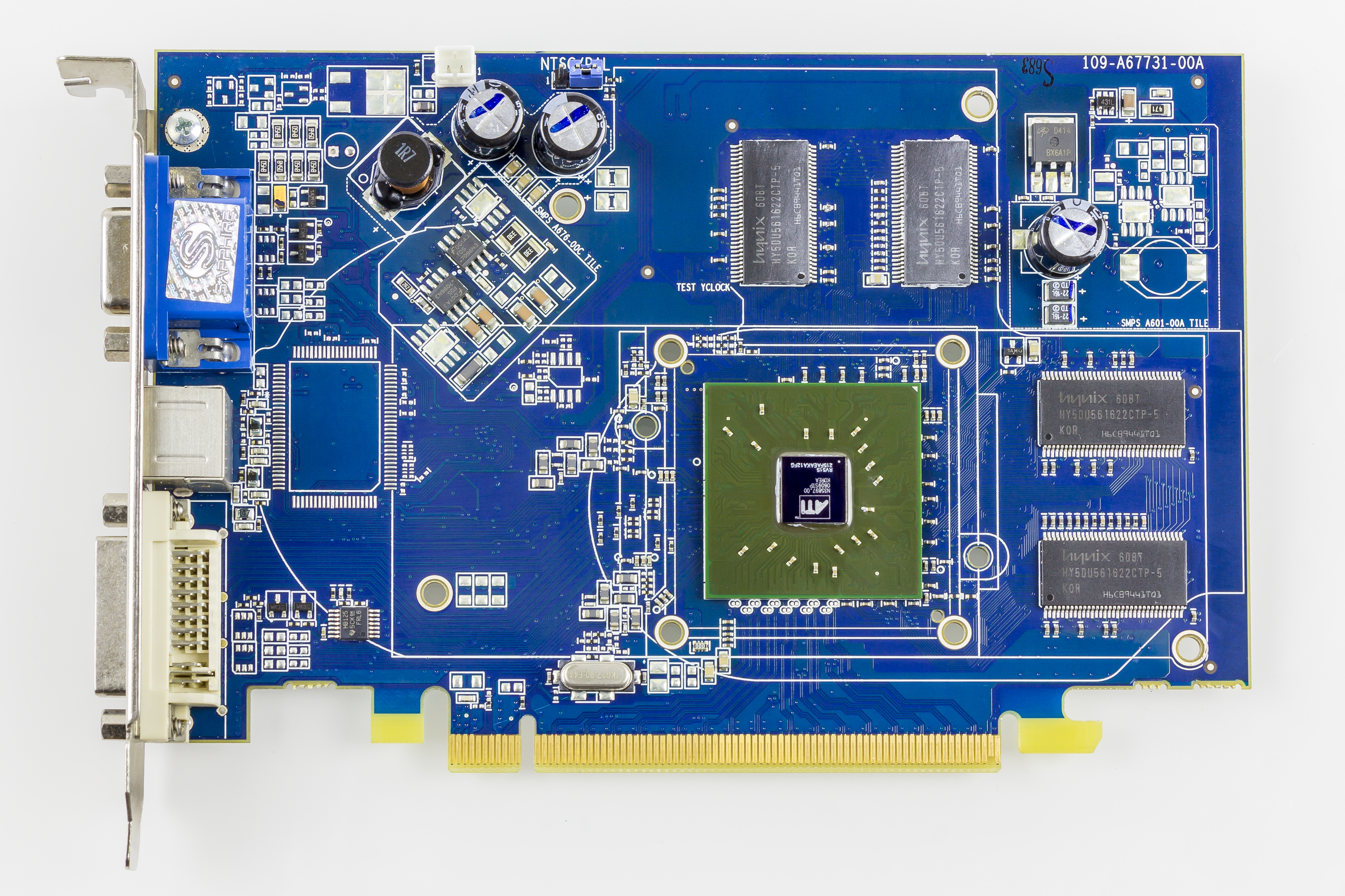
X1300 with GPU RV515 (heat sink removed)

This series is the budget solution of the X1000 series and is based on the RV515 core. The chips have four texture units, four ROPs, four pixel shaders, and 2 vertex shaders, similar to the older X300 – X600 cards. These chips use one quad of an R520, whereas the faster boards use just more of these quads; for example, the X1800 uses four quads. This modular design allows ATI to build a "top to bottom" line-up using identical technology, saving research, development time, and money. Because of its smaller design, these cards offer lower power demands (30 watts), so they run cooler and can be used in smaller cases. Eventually, ATI created the X1550 and discontinued the X1300. The X1050 was based on the R300 core and was sold as an ultra-low-budget part.

Early Mobility Radeon X1300 to X1450 are based around the RV515 core as well.

Beginning in 2006, Radeon X1300 and X1550 products were shifted to the RV505 core, which had similar capabilities and features as the previous RV515 core, but was manufactured by TSMC using an 80 nm process (reduced from the 90 nm process of the RV515).

=== X1600 series ===
X1600 uses the M56 core which is based on the RV530 core, a core similar but distinct from RV515.

The RV530 has a 3:1 ratio of pixel shaders to texture units. It possesses 12 pixel shaders while retaining RV515's four texture units and four ROPs. It also gains three extra vertex shaders, bringing the total to 5 units. The chip's single "quad" has 3 pixel shader processors per pipeline, similar to the design of R580's 4 quads. This means that RV530 has the same texturing ability as the X1300 at the same clock speed, but with its 12 pixel shaders it is on par with the X1800 in shader computational performance. Due to the programming content of available games, the X1600 is greatly hampered by lack of texturing power.

The X1600 was positioned to replace Radeon X600 and Radeon X700 as ATI's mid-range GPU. The Mobility Radeon X1600 and X1700 are also based on the RV530.

=== X1650 series ===
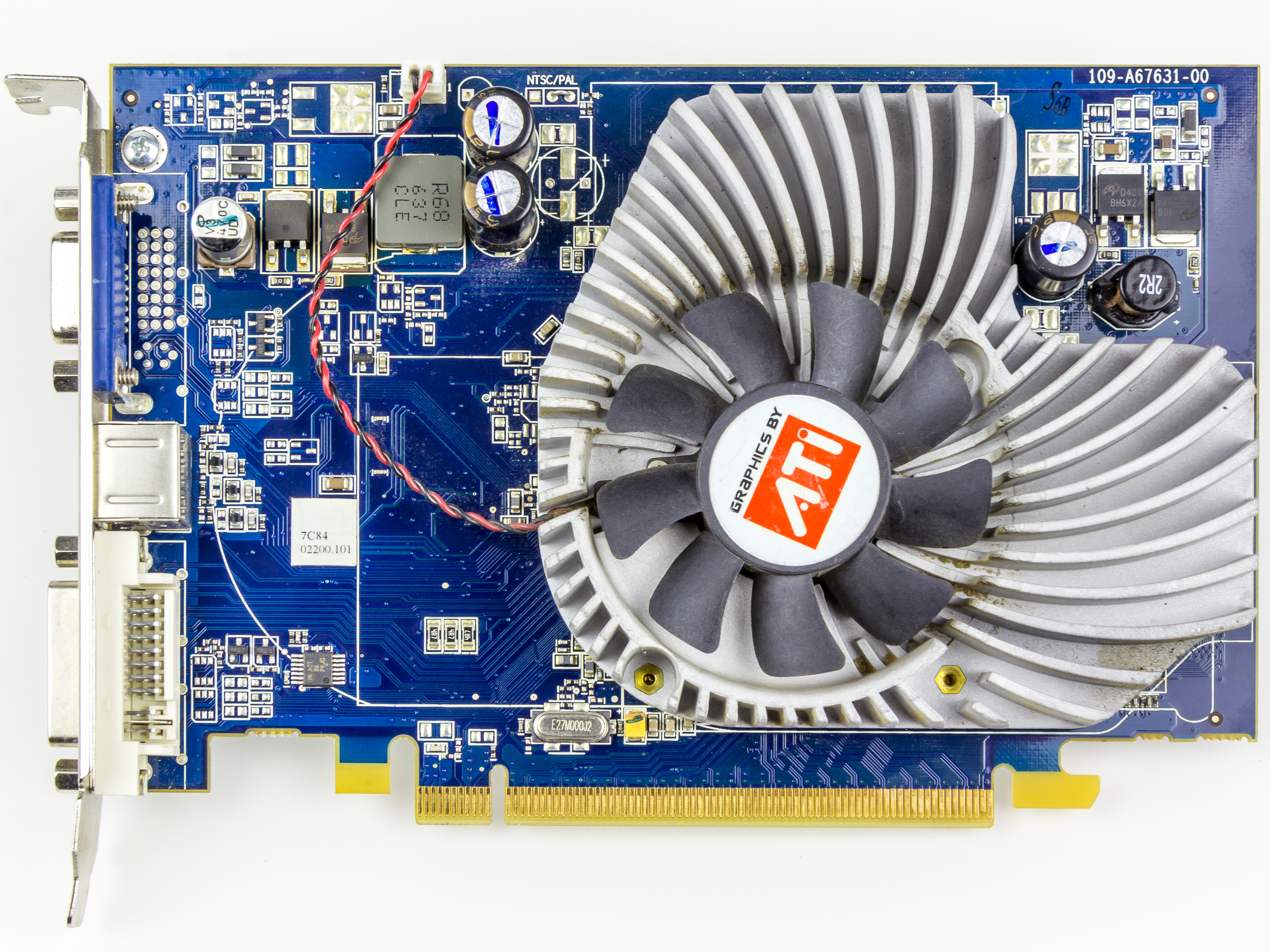
ATI Radeon X1650 Pro

The X1650 series has two parts: the X1650 Pro uses the RV535 core (which is a RV530 core manufactured on the newer 80 nm process), and has both a lower power consumption and heat output than the X1600. The other part, the X1650XT/X1650GT, uses the newer RV570 core (also known as the RV560) though it has lower processing power (note that the fully equipped RV570 core powers the X1950Pro, a high-performance card) to match its main competitor, Nvidia's 7600GT. There's also Radeon X1650, which technically belongs to the previous generation of X1600, because it uses old 90nm RV530 core. If you look closely at the specs, it's basically renamed Radeon X1600 Pro with DDR2 memory.

=== X1800 series ===
Originally the flagship of the X1000 series, the X1800 series was released with mild reception due to the rolling release and the gain by its competitor at that time, NVIDIA's GeForce 7 series. When the X1800 entered the market in late 2005, it was the first high-end video card with a 90 nm GPU. ATI opted to fit the cards with either 256 MB or 512 MB on-board memory (foreseeing a future of ever growing demands on local memory size). The X1800XT PE was exclusively on 512 MB on-board memory. The X1800 replaced the R480-based Radeon X850 as ATI's premier performance GPU.

With R520's delayed release, its competition was far more impressive than if the chip had made its originally scheduled spring/summer release. Like its predecessor, the X850, the R520 chip carries 4 "quads", which means it has similar texturing capability at the same clock speed as its ancestor and the NVIDIA 6800 series. Unlike the X850, the R520's shader units are vastly improved: they are Shader Model 3 capable, and received some advancements in shader threading that can greatly improve the efficiency of the shader units. Unlike the X1900, the X1800 has 16 pixel shader processors and equal ratio of texturing to pixel shading capability. The chip also increases the vertex shader number from six on the X800 to eight. With the 90 nm low-K fabrication process, these high-transistor chips could still be clocked at very high frequencies, which allows the X1800 series to be competitive with GPUs with more pipelines but lower clock speeds, such as the NVIDIA 7800 and 7900 series that use 24 pipelines.

The X1800 was quickly replaced by the X1900 because of its delayed release. The X1900 was not behind schedule, and was always planned as the "spring refresh" chip. However, due to the large quantity of unused X1800 chips, ATI decided to kill one quad of pixel pipelines and sell them off as the X1800GTO.

=== X1900 and X1950 series ===
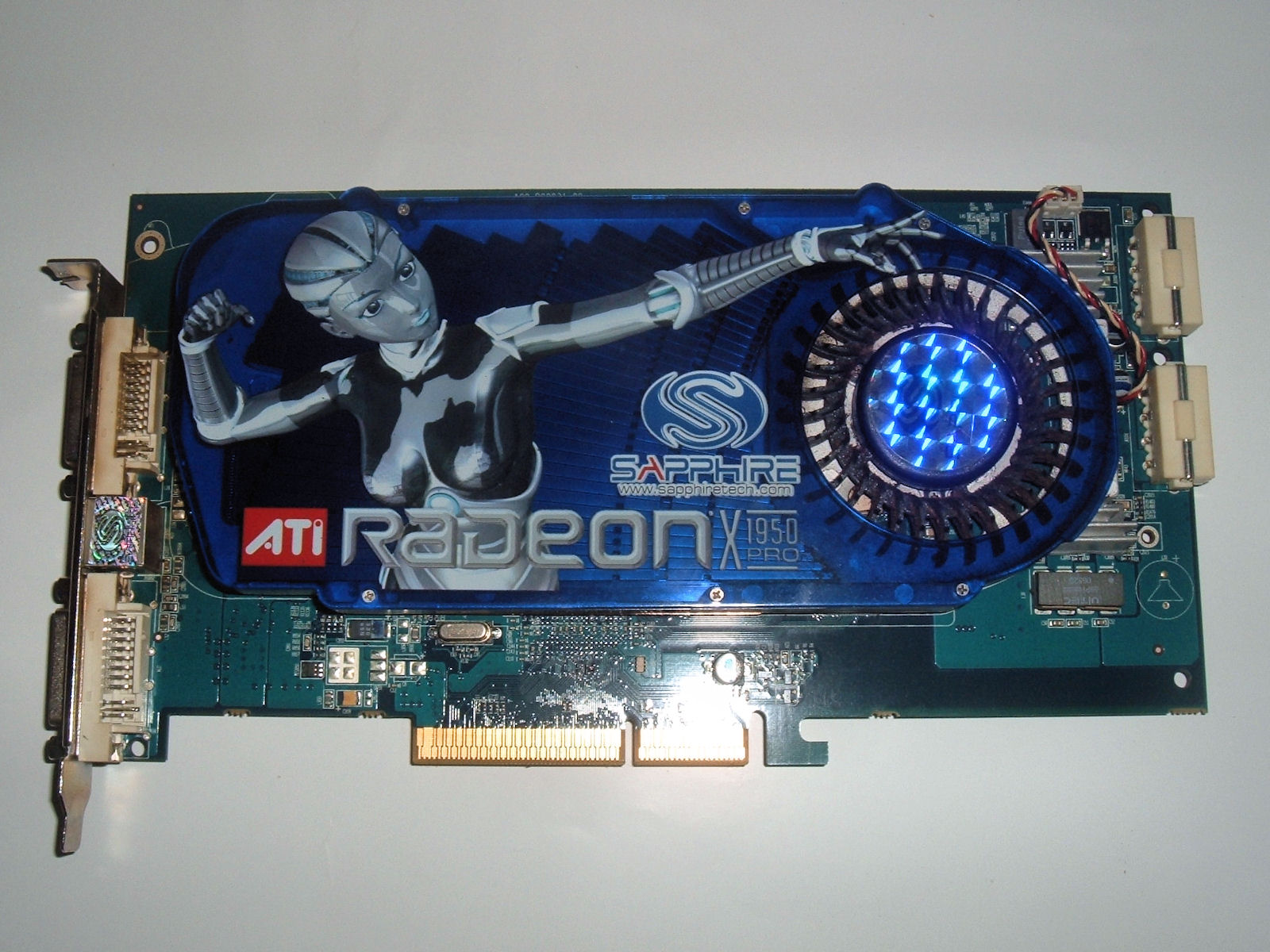
Sapphire Radeon X1950 Pro

The X1900 and X1950 series fixed several flaws in the X1800 design and added a significant pixel shading performance boost. The R580 core is pin-compatible with the R520 PCBs, which meant a redesign of the X1800 PCB was not needed. The boards carry either 256 MB or 512 MB of onboard GDDR3 memory depending on the variant. The primary change between the R580 and the R520 is that ATI changed the pixel shader processor-to-texture processor ratio. The X1900 cards have three pixel shaders on each pipeline instead of one, giving a total of 48 pixel shader units. ATI took this step with the expectation that future 3D software will be more pixel shader intensive.

In the latter half of 2006, ATI introduced the Radeon X1950 XTX, which is a graphics board using a revised R580 GPU called R580+. R580+ is the same as R580 except it supports GDDR4 memory, a new graphics DRAM technology that offers lower power consumption per clock and offers a significantly higher clock rate ceiling. The X1950 XTX clocks its RAM at 1 GHz (2 GHz DDR), providing 64.0 GB/s of memory bandwidth, a 29% advantage over the X1900 XTX. The card was launched on August 23, 2006.

The X1950 Pro was released on October 17, 2006, and was intended to replace the X1900GT in the competitive sub-$200 market segment. The X1950 Pro GPU is built off of the 80 nm RV570 core with only 12 texture units and 36 pixel shaders, and is the first ATI card that supports native Crossfire implementation by a pair of internal Crossfire connectors, which eliminates the need for the unwieldy external dongle found in older Crossfire systems.

== Radeon feature matrix ==
The following table shows features of AMD/ATI's GPUs (see also: List of AMD graphics processing units).

Name of GPU series	Wonder	Mach	3D Rage	Rage Pro	Rage 128	R100	R200	R300	R400	R500	R600	RV670	R700	Evergreen	Northern Islands		Southern Islands	Sea Islands	Volcanic Islands	Arctic Islands/Polaris	Vega	Navi 1x	Navi 2x	Navi 3x	Navi 4x
Released	1986	1991	Apr; 1996	Mar; 1997	Aug; 1998	Apr; 2000	Aug; 2001	Sep; 2002	May; 2004	Oct; 2005	May; 2007	Nov; 2007	Jun; 2008	Sep; 2009	Oct; 2010	Dec; 2010	Jan; 2012	Sep; 2013	Jun; 2015	Jun 2016, Apr 2017, Aug 2019	Jun 2017, Feb 2019	Jul; 2019	Nov; 2020	Dec; 2022	Feb; 2025
Marketing Name	Wonder	Mach	3D; Rage	Rage; Pro	Rage; 128	Radeon; 7000	Radeon; 8000	Radeon; 9000	Radeon; X700/X800	Radeon; X1000	Radeon; HD 2000	Radeon; HD 3000	Radeon; HD 4000	Radeon; HD 5000	Radeon; HD 6000		Radeon; HD 7000	Radeon; 200	Radeon; 300	Radeon; 400/500/600	Radeon; RX Vega, Radeon VII	Radeon; RX 5000	Radeon; RX 6000	Radeon; RX 7000	Radeon; RX 9000
AMD support	Ended																			Current					
Kind	2D		3D																						
Instruction set architecture	Not publicly known									Multiple (Note: R500 has two instruction sets. Vertex shader cores: "PVS instruction set". Pixel shader cores: "US instruction set".)	TeraScale instruction set						GCN instruction set					RDNA instruction set			
Microarchitecture	Not publicly known					GFX1		GFX2			TeraScale 1 (VLIW5) (GFX3)			TeraScale 2 (VLIW5) (GFX4)	TeraScale 2 (VLIW5) up to 68xx (GFX4)	TeraScale 3 (VLIW4) in 69xx (GFX5)	GCN 1st gen (GFX6)	GCN 2nd gen (GFX7)	GCN 3rd gen (GFX8)	GCN 4th gen (GFX8)	GCN 5th gen (GFX9)	RDNA (GFX10.1)	RDNA 2 (GFX10.3)	RDNA 3 (GFX11)	RDNA 4 (GFX12)
Type	Fixed pipeline (Note: The Radeon R100 Series has programmable pixel shaders, but do not fully comply with DirectX 8 or Pixel Shader 1.0. See article on R100's pixel shaders.)						Programmable pixel & vertex pipelines				Unified shader model														
Direct3D	—N/a		5.0	6.0		7.0	8.1	9.0; 11 (9_2)	9.0b 11 (9_2)	9.0c 11 (9_3)	10.0; 11 (10_0)	10.1; 11 (10_1)		11 (11_0)			11 (11_1); 12 (11_1)	11 (12_0); 12 (12_0)			11 (12_1); 12 (12_1)		11 (12_1); 12 (12_2)		
Shader model	—N/a						1.4	2.0+	2.0b	3.0	4.0	4.1		5.0			5.1	5.1; 6.5			6.7				6.8
OpenGL	—N/a			1.1	1.2	1.3		1.5 (Note: R300, R400 and R500 based cards do not fully comply with OpenGL 2+ as the hardware does not support all types of non-power of two (NPOT) textures.)			3.3			4.5 (Windows), 4.6 (Linux Mesa 25.2+)			4.6 (Note: OpenGL 4+ compliance requires supporting FP64 shaders and these are emulated on some TeraScale chips using 32-bit hardware.)								
Vulkan	—N/a															1.1 (Note: Vulkan support is theoretically possible but has not been implemented in a stable driver.)	1.3 (Note: Vulkan support in Linux relies on the AMDgpu kernel driver, the radeon driver does not support Vulkan.)		1.4						
OpenCL	—N/a										Close to Metal		1.1 (not supported by Mesa)	1.2+ (on Linux: 1.1+ (no Image support on Clover, with Rusticl) with Mesa, 1.2+ on GCN 1.Gen)				2.0+ (Adrenalin driver on Win 7+) (on Linux ROCm, Mesa 1.2+ (no support in Clover, only Rusticl, Mesa, 2.0+ and 3.0 with AMD drivers or AMD ROCm), 5th gen: 2.2 win 10+ and Linux RocM 5.0+				2.2+ and 3.0 Windows 8.1+ and Linux ROCm 5.0+ (Mesa Rusticl 1.2+ and 3.0 (2.1+ and 2.2+))			
HSA / ROCm	—N/a																Yes					?			
Video decoding ASIC	—N/a										Avivo/UVD	UVD+	UVD 2	UVD 2.2	UVD 3		UVD 4	UVD 4.2	UVD 5.0 or 6.0	UVD 6.3	UVD 7 (Note: The UVD and VCE were replaced by the Video Core Next (VCN) ASIC in the Raven Ridge APU implementation of Vega.)	VCN 2.0	VCN 3.0	VCN 4.0	VCN 5.0
Video encoding ASIC	—N/a																VCE 1.0	VCE 2.0	VCE 3.0 or 3.1	VCE 3.4	VCE 4.0	VCN 2.0	VCN 3.0	VCN 4.0	VCN 5.0
Fluid Motion (Note: Video processing for video frame rate interpolation technique. In Windows it works as a DirectShow filter in your player. In Linux, there is no support on the part of drivers and / or community.)	No																	Yes				No		?	
Power saving	?										PowerPlay				PowerTune		PowerTune & ZeroCore Power					?			
TrueAudio	—N/a																	Via dedicated DSP		Via shaders					
FreeSync	—N/a																	1; 2							
HDCP (Note: To play protected video content, it also requires card, operating system, driver, and application support. A compatible HDCP display is also needed for this. HDCP is mandatory for the output of certain audio formats, placing additional constraints on the multimedia setup.)	—N/a										?							1.4		2.2		2.3			
PlayReady	—N/a																			3.0	No	3.0			
Supported displays (Note: More displays may be supported with native DisplayPort connections, or splitting the maximum resolution between multiple monitors with active converters.)						1–2	2							2–6								?			4
Max. resolution	?													2–6 × 2560×1600			2–6 × 4096×2160 @ 30 Hz			2–6 × 5120×2880 @ 60 Hz	3 × 7680×4320 @ 60 Hz	7680×4320 @ 60 Hz PowerColor		7680x4320 @165 Hz	7680x4320
/drm/radeon (Note: DRM (Direct Rendering Manager) is a component of the Linux kernel. AMDgpu is the Linux kernel module. Support in this table refers to the most current version.)						Yes													—N/a						
/drm/amdgpu	—N/a																Yes Kernel 6.19+		Yes						

== Chipset table ==
Note that ATI X1000 series cards (e.g. X1900) do not have Vertex Texture Fetch, hence they do not fully comply with the VS 3.0 model. Instead, they offer a feature called "Render to Vertex Buffer (R2VB)" that provides functionality that is an alternative Vertex Texture Fetch.

Model	Launch	Code name	Fab (nm)	Transistors (million)	Die size (mm^{2})	Bus interface	Clock rate		Core config	Fillrate				Memory				TDP (Watts)	API support (version)		Release Price (USD)
Model	Launch	Code name	Fab (nm)	Transistors (million)	Die size (mm^{2})	Bus interface	Core (MHz)	Memory (MHz)	Core config	MOperations/s	MPixels/s	MVertices/s	MTexels/s	Size (MB)	Bandwidth (GB/s)	Bus type	Bus width (bit)	Max.	Direct3D	OpenGL	Release Price (USD)
Radeon X1300	October 5, 2005 (PCIe); December 1, 2005 (AGP)	RV515	90	107	100	AGP 8× PCI; PCIe ×16	450	250	4:2:4:4	1800	1800	225	1800	128; 256	8.0	DDR DDR2	128		9.0c	2.1	$99 (128MB) $129 (256 MB)
Radeon X1300 HyperMemory	October 5, 2005	RV515	90	107	100	PCIe ×16	450	250	4:2:4:4	1800	1800	225	1800	128; 256; 512	4.0	DDR2	64		9.0c	2.1	$
Radeon X1300 PRO	October 5, 2005 (PCIe); November 1, 2006 (AGP)	RV515	90	107	100	AGP 8× PCIe ×16	600	400	4:2:4:4	2400	2400	300	2400	128; 256	12.8	DDR2	128	31	9.0c	2.1	$149
Radeon X1300 XT	August 12, 2006	RV530	90	157	150	AGP 8× PCIe ×16	500	400	12:5:4:4	6000	2000	625	2000	128; 256	12.8	DDR2	128	22	9.0c	2.1	$89
Radeon X1550	January 8, 2007	RV516	90	107	100	AGP 8x PCI; PCIe x16	500	400	4:2:4:4	2200	2200	275	2200	128; 256; 512	12.8	DDR2	128	27	9.0c	2.1	$
Radeon X1600 PRO	October 10, 2005	RV530	90	157	150	AGP 8× PCIe ×16	500	390; 390–690	12:5:4:4	6000	2000	625	2000	128; 256; 512	12.48	DDR2; GDDR3	128	41	9.0c	2.1	$149 (128MB) $199 (256 MB)
Radeon X1600 XT	October 10, 2005 (PCIe)	RV530	90	157	150	AGP 8× PCIe ×16	590	690	12:5:4:4	7080	2360	737.5	2360	256; 512	22.08	GDDR3	128	42	9.0c	2.1	$249
Radeon X1650	February 1, 2007	RV530	90	157	150	AGP 8× PCIe ×16	500	400	12:5:4:4	6000	2000	625	2000	256; 512	12.8	DDR2	128		9.0c	2.1	$
Radeon X1650 SE		RV516	90	105		PCIe ×16	635	400	4:2:4:4					256	12.8	DDR2	128		9.0c	2.1	$
Radeon X1650 GT	May 1, 2007 (PCIe); October 1, 2007 (AGP)	RV560	80	330	230	AGP 8× PCIe x16	400	400	24:8:8:8	9600	3200	800	3200	256; 512	12.8	GDDR3	128		9.0c	2.1	$
Radeon X1650 PRO	August 23, 2006 (PCIe); October 15, 2006 (AGP)	RV535	80	330	131	AGP 8× PCIe x16	600	700	12:5:4:4	7200	2400	750	2400	256; 512	22.4	GDDR3	128	44	9.0c	2.1	$99
Radeon X1650 XT	October 30, 2006	RV560	80	330	230	AGP 8× PCIe x16	525	700	24:8:8:8	12600	4200	1050	4200	256; 512	22.4	GDDR3	128	55	9.0c	2.1	$149
Radeon X1700 FSC	November 5, 2007 (OEM)	RV535	80	330	131	PCIe ×16	587	695	12:5:4:4	7044	2348	733	2348	256	22.2	GDDR3	128	44	9.0c	2.1	OEM
Radeon X1700 SE	November 30, 2007	RV560	80	330	230	PCIe ×16	500	500	24:8:8:8	12000	4000	1000	4000	512	16.0	GDDR3	128	50	9.0c	2.1	$
Radeon X1800 CrossFire Edition	December 20, 2005	R520	90	321	288	PCIe ×16	600	700	16:8:16:16	9600	9600	900	9600	512	46.08	GDDR3	256	113	9.0c	2.1	$
Radeon X1800 GTO	March 9, 2006	R520	90	321	288	PCIe ×16	500	495	12:8:12:8	6000	6000	1000	6000	256; 512	32.0	GDDR3	256	48	9.0c	2.1	$249
Radeon X1800 XL	October 5, 2005	R520	90	321	288	PCIe ×16	500	500	16:8:16:16	8000	8000	1000	8000	256	32.0	GDDR3	256	70	9.0c	2.1	$449
Radeon X1800 XT	October 5, 2005	R520	90	321	288	PCIe ×16	625	750	16:8:16:16	10000	10000	1250	10000	256; 512	48.0	GDDR3	256	113	9.0c	2.1	$499 (256MB) $549 (512 MB)
Radeon X1900 CrossFire Edition	January 24, 2006	R580	90	384	352	PCIe ×16	625	725	48:8:16:16	30000	10000	1250	10000	512	46.4	GDDR3	256	100	9.0c	2.1	$599
Radeon X1900 GT	May 5, 2006	R580	90	384	352	PCIe ×16	575	600	36:8:12:12	20700	6900	1150	6900	256	38.4	GDDR3	256	75	9.0c	2.1	$
Radeon X1900 GT Rev. 2	September 7, 2006	R580	90	384	352	PCIe ×16	512	600	36:8:12:12	18432	6144	1024	6144	256	42.64	GDDR3	256		9.0c	2.1	$
Radeon X1900 XT	January 24, 2006	R580	90	384	352	PCIe ×16	625	725	48:8:16:16	30000	10000	1250	10000	256; 512	46.4	GDDR3	256	100	9.0c	2.1	$549
Radeon X1900 XTX	January 24, 2006	R580	90	384	352	PCIe ×16	650	775	48:8:16:16	31200	10400	1300	10400	512	49.6	GDDR3	256	135	9.0c	2.1	$649
Radeon X1950 CrossFire Edition	August 23, 2006	R580+	80	384	352	PCIe ×16	650	1000	48:8:16:16	31200	10400	1300	10400	512	64	GDDR4	256		9.0c	2.1	$449
Radeon X1950 GT	January 29, 2007 (PCIe); February 10, 2007 (AGP)	RV570	80	330	230	AGP 8x PCIe x16	500	600	36:8:12:12	18000	6000	1000	6000	256; 512	38.4	GDDR3	256	57	9.0c	2.1	$140
Radeon X1950 PRO	October 17, 2006 (PCIe); October 25, 2006 (AGP)	RV570	80	330	230	AGP 8x PCIe x16	575	690	36:8:12:12	20700	6900	1150	6900	256; 512	44.16	GDDR3	256	66	9.0c	2.1	$199
Radeon X1950 XT	October 17, 2006 (PCIe); February 18, 2007 (AGP)	R580+	80	384	352	AGP 8x PCIe 1.0 x16	625	700 (AGP); 900 (PCIe)	48:8:16:16	30000	10000	1250	10000	256; 512	44.8 (AGP); 57.6 (PCIe)	GDDR3	256	96	9.0c	2.1	$
Radeon X1950 XTX	October 17, 2006	R580+	80	384	352	PCIe 1.0 ×16	650	1000	48:8:16:16	31200	10400	1300	10400	512	64	GDDR4	256	125	9.0c	2.1	$449
Model	Launch	Code name	Fab (nm)	Transistors (million)	Die size (mm^{2})	Bus interface	Core (MHz)	Memory (MHz)	Core config	MOperations/s	MPixels/s	MVertices/s	MTexels/s	Size (MB)	Bandwidth (GB/s)	Bus type	Bus width (bit)	Max.	Direct3D	OpenGL	Release price (USD)
Model	Launch	Code name	Fab (nm)	Transistors (million)	Die size (mm^{2})	Bus interface	Clock rate		Core config	Fillrate				Memory				TDP (Watts)	API support (version)		Release price (USD)

^{1} Pixel shaders : Vertex shaders : Texture mapping units : Render output units

=== Mobility Radeon X1000 series ===
Model	Launch	Model number	Code name	Fab (nm)	Bus interface	Core clock (MHz)	Memory clock (MHz)	Core config^{1}	Fillrate		Memory				API compliance (version)		Notes
Model	Launch	Model number	Code name	Fab (nm)	Bus interface	Core clock (MHz)	Memory clock (MHz)	Core config^{1}	Pixel (GP/s)	Texture (GT/s)	Size (MB)	Bandwidth (GB/s)	Bus type	Bus width (bit)	Direct3D	OpenGL	Notes
Mobility Radeon X1300	January 19, 2006	M52	RV515	90	PCIe ×16	350	250	2:4:4:4	1.4	1.4	128 + shared	8	DDR DDR2	128	9.0c	2.0	
Mobility Radeon X1350	September 18, 2006	M62	RV515	90	PCIe ×16	470	350	2:4:4:4	1.88	1.88	128 + shared	11.2	DDR2 GDDR3	128	9.0c	2.0	
Mobility Radeon X1400	January 19, 2006	M54	RV515	90	PCIe ×16	445	250	2:4:4:4	1.78	1.78	128 + shared	8	DDR DDR2	128	9.0c	2.0	
Mobility Radeon X1450	September 18, 2006	M64	RV515	90	PCIe ×16	550	450	2:4:4:4	2.2	2.2	128 + shared	14.4	DDR2 GDDR3	128	9.0c	2.0	
Mobility Radeon X1600	February 1, 2006	M56	RV530	90	PCIe ×16	425; 450	375; 470	5:12:4:4	1.7; 1.8	1.7; 1.8	256	12.0; 15.04	DDR2; GDDR3	128	9.0c	2.0	
Mobility Radeon X1700	February 1, 2006	M66	RV535	90	PCIe ×16	475	400; 550	5:12:4:4	1.9	1.9	256	11.2; 17.6	DDR2; GDDR3	128	9.0c	2.0	strained silicon
Mobility Radeon X1800	March 1, 2006	M58	R520	90	PCIe ×16	450	500	8:12:12:12	5.4	5.4	256	32	GDDR3	256	9.0c	2.0	
Mobility Radeon X1800 XT	March 1, 2006	M58	R520	90	PCIe ×16	550	650	8:16:16:16	8.8	8.8	256	41.6	GDDR3	256	9.0c	2.0	
Mobility Radeon X1900	January 11, 2007	M68	RV570	80	PCIe ×16	400	470	8:36:12:12	4.8	4.8	256	30.08	GDDR3	256	9.0c	2.0	PowerPlay 6.0

^{1} Vertex shaders : Pixel shaders : Texture mapping units : Render output units.

== See also ==
- List of AMD graphics processing units
- Free and open-source device drivers: graphics#ATI.2FAMD
