= DMS-59 =

Video output connector for dual monitor use carrying digital and analog signals

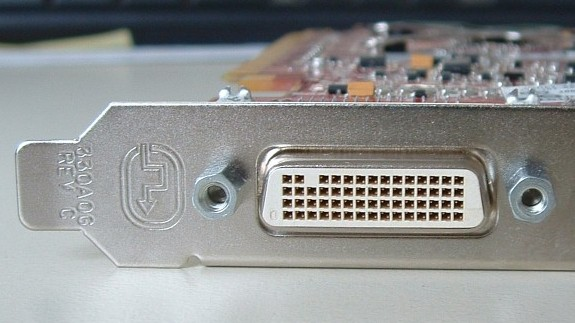
DMS-59 connector

DMS-59 connector pinout details

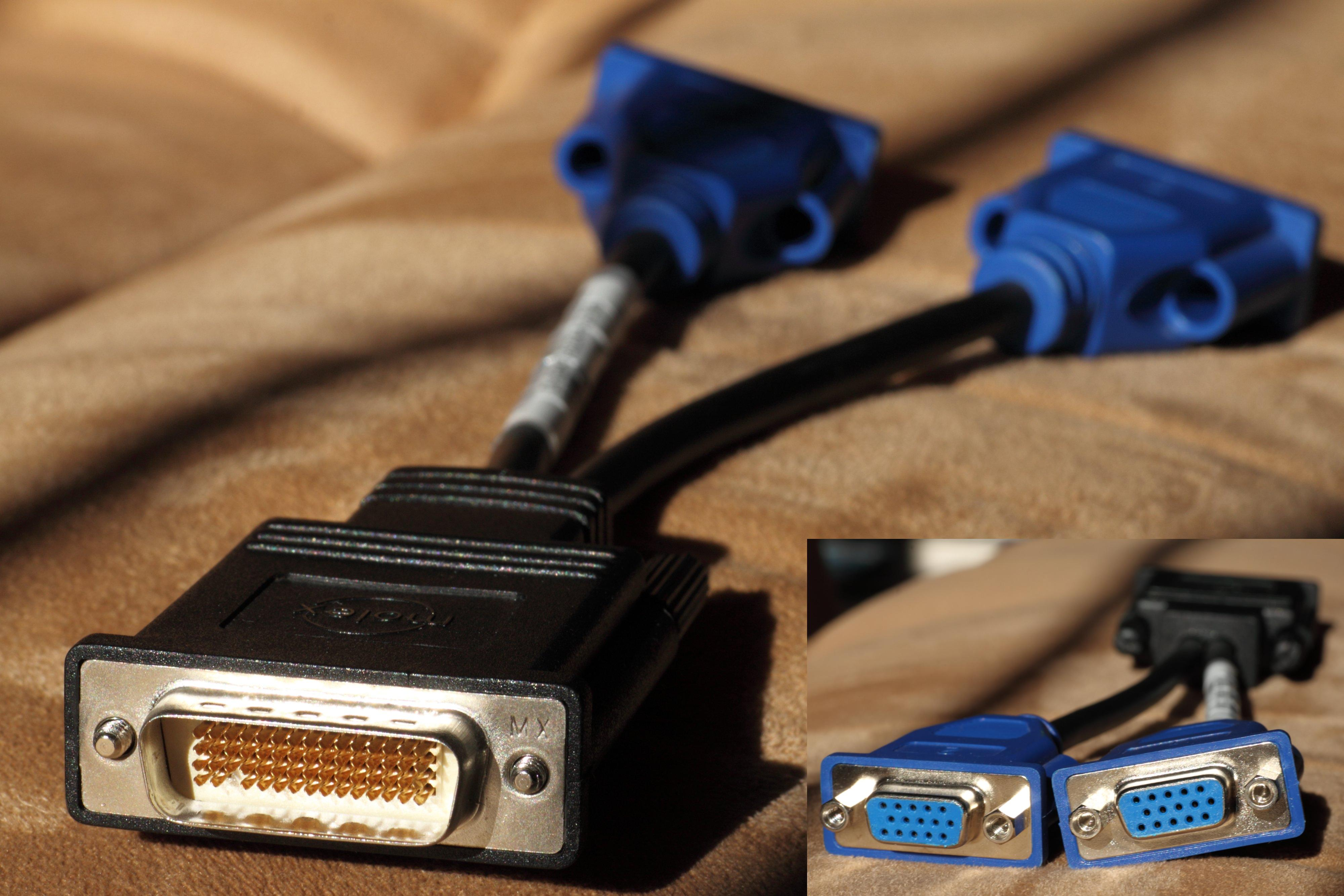
DMS-59 to dual VGA adapter

DMS-59 (Dual Monitor Solution, 59 pins) is generally used for computer video cards. It provides two Digital Visual Interface (DVI) or Video Graphics Array (VGA) outputs in a single connector. A Y-style breakout cable is needed for the transition from the DMS-59 output (digital + analogue) to DVI (digital) or VGA (analogue), and different types of adapter cables exist. The connector is four pins high and 15 pins wide, with a single pin missing from the bottom row, in a D-shaped shell, with thumbscrews. By December 2020, this adapter cable had been listed as obsolete by its primary vendor Molex.

The advantage of DMS-59 is its ability to support two high resolution displays, such as two DVI Single Link digital channels or two VGA analog channels, with a single DVI-size connector. The compact size lets a low-profile card support two high resolution displays, and a full-height card (with two DMS-59 connectors) up to four high resolution displays.

The DMS-59 connector was used by e.g. AMD (AMD FireMV), Nvidia and Matrox for video cards sold in some Lenovo ThinkStation models, Viglen Genies and Omninos, Dell, HP and Compaq computers. DMS-59 connectors also appeared on Sun Computers. Some confusion has been caused by the fact that vendors label cards with DMS-59 as “supports DVI”, but the cards have no DVI connectors built-in. Such cards, when equipped with only a VGA connector adapter cable, cannot be connected to a monitor with only a DVI-D input. A DMS-59 to DVI adapter cable needs to be used with such monitors.

The DMS-59 connector is derived from the LFH-60 Molex low-force helix connector, which could be found in some earlier graphics cards. These ports are similar to DMS-59, but have all 60 pins present, whereas DMS-59 has one pin (pin 58) blocked. A connector plug with all 60 pins (such as a Molex 88766-7610 DVI-I splitter) does not fit into a properly keyed DMS-59 socket.

A Dual-DVI breakout cable can be used in connection with two passive DVI-to-HDMI adapters to feed modern displays with HDMI inputs, while using a DMS-59 graphics card, since the DVI signals are electrically identical to HDMI signals and do not require any kind of conversion.
