= Radeon R400 series =

Series of video cards

ATI Radeon X700/X800 series
- Release date: 2004–2005
- Codename: Loki
- Architecture: Radeon R400

Cards
- Entry-level: None
- Mid-range: X700, X740
- High-end: X800
- Enthusiast: X850

API support
- Direct3D: Direct3D 9.0b Shader Model 2.0b
- OpenGL: OpenGL 2.0

History
- Predecessor: Radeon 9000 series Radeon X300 series Radeon X500 series Radeon X600 series
- Successor: Radeon X1000 series

Support status
- Unsupported

The R420 GPU, developed by ATI Technologies, was the company's basis for its 3rd-generation DirectX 9.0/OpenGL 2.0-capable graphics cards. Used first on the Radeon X800, the R420 was produced on a 0.13 micrometer (130 nm) low-K photolithography process and used GDDR-3 memory. The chip was designed for AGP graphics cards.

Driver support of this core was discontinued as of Catalyst 9.4, and as a result there is no official Windows 7 support for any of the X700 - X850 products.

== Development ==
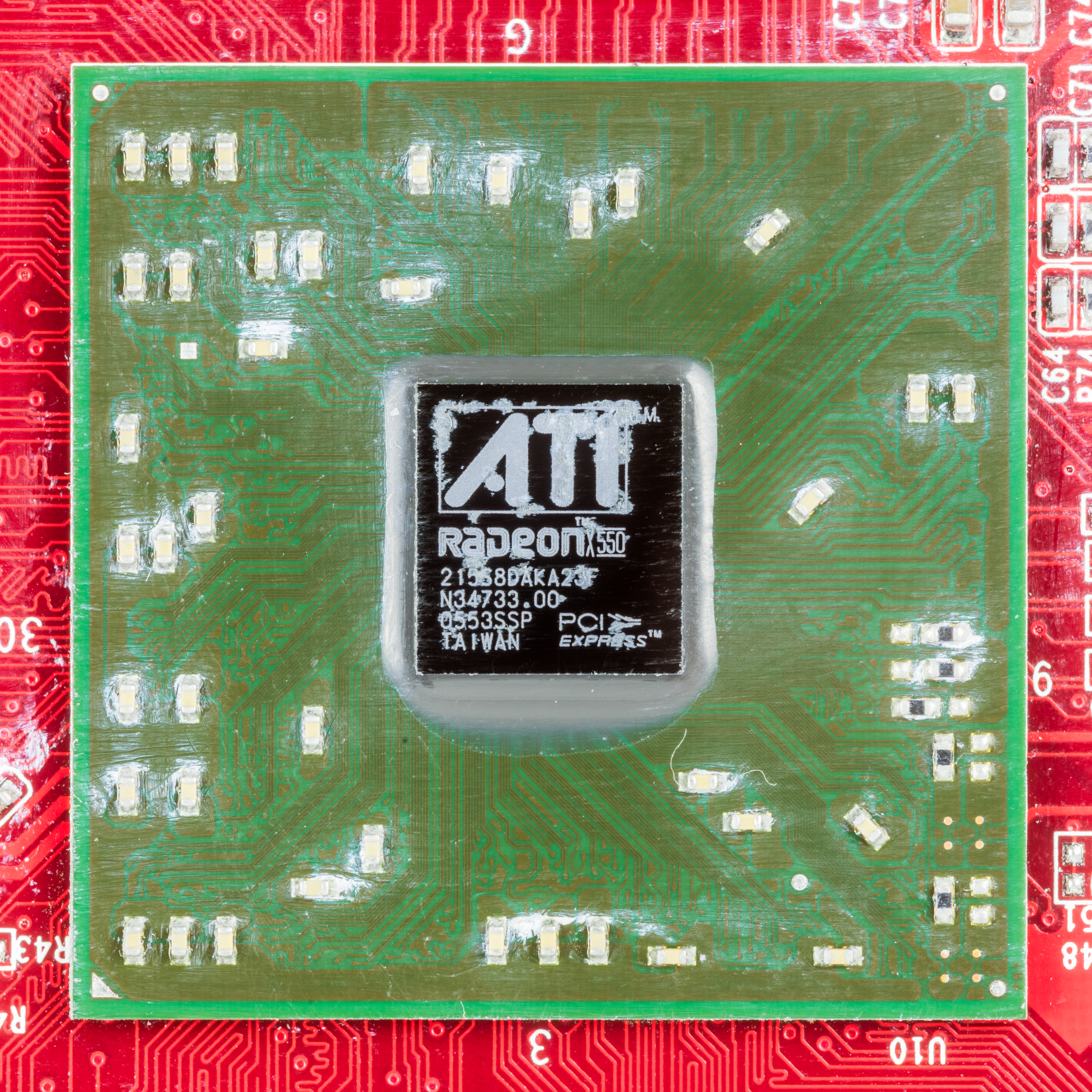
Radeon X550 chip

In terms of supported DirectX features, R420 (codenamed Loki) was very similar to the R300. R420 basically takes a "wider is better" approach to the previous architecture, with some small tweaks thrown in to enhance it in various ways. The chip came equipped with over double the pixel and vertex pushing resources compared to the Radeon 9800 XT's R360 (a minor evolution of the R350), with 16 DirectX 9.0b pixel pipelines and 16 ROPs. One would not be far off seeing the X800 XT basically as a pair of Radeon 9800 cores connected together and also running with a ~30% higher clock speed.

The R420 design was a 4 "quad" arrangement (4 pipelines per quad.) This organization internally allowed ATI to disable defective "quads" and sell chips with 12, 8 or even 4 pixel pipelines, an evolution of the technique used with Radeon 9500/9700 and 9800SE/9800. The separation into "quads" also allowed ATI to design a system to optimize the efficiency of the overall chip. Coined the "quad dispatch system", the screen is tiled and work is spread out evenly among the separate "quads" to optimize their throughput. This is how the R300-series chips performed their tasks as well, but R420 refined this by allowing programmable tile sizes in order to control work flow on a finer level of granularity. Apparently by reducing tile sizes, ATI was able to optimize for different triangle sizes.

When ATI doubled the number of pixel pipelines, they also raised the number of vertex shader engines from 4 to 6. This changed the ratio of pixel/vertex shaders from 2:1 (on R300) to 8:3, showing that ATI believed the workload in games as of 2004 and onward to be more pixel shader and texturing oriented than geometry based. Normal and parallax mapping were replacing sheer geometric complexity for model detail, so undoubtedly that was part of the reasoning. Strangely, the X700 mainstream card (RV410) had 6 vertex shaders while only being equipped with 2 quads. As such, this chip was obviously designed for a heavier geometry load than texturing, perhaps being tailored for a role as a FireGL chip. RV410 also significantly outgunned NVIDIA's GeForce 6600GT (3 vertex shaders) on geometry throughput. With R420's and RV410's 6 vertex shaders combined with higher clock speeds than the previous generation, ATI was able to more than double the geometry processing capability of 9800XT.

Although the R420-based chips are fundamentally similar to R300-based cores, ATI did tweak and enhance the pixel shader units for more flexibility. A new pixel shader version (PS2.b) allowed slightly greater shader program flexibility than plain PS2.0, but was still shy of full PS3.0 capabilities. This new revision to PS2.0 increased the maximum number of instructions and registers available to pixel shader programs.

ATI revealed Temporal Anti-Aliasing, a new anti-aliasing technology their chips were capable of. By taking advantage of the frame-to-eye effects of a framerate higher than 60 frame/s, the GPU is able to better smooth aliased edges by rotating the anti-aliasing sampling pattern between frames. A 2X software setting became perceptively equivalent to 4X. Unfortunately, it required the system to be able to maintain at least 60 frame/s or temporal anti-aliasing would cause a noticeable flickering, because the user would be able to see the alternating AA patterns. If the framerate could not be maintained, the driver will disable Temporal AA. However, in games which this performance level could be maintained, Temporal AA was a nice addition to ATI's excellent anti-aliasing options. Note, ATI's "Temporal AA" was actually a temporal dithering filter for spatial AA, not de facto temporal anti-aliasing (which must involve a controlled blending of the temporal subsamples from consecutive screens).

ATI's Ruby: The Doublecross X800 promo demo

Another notable addition to the core was a new kind of normal map compression, dubbed "3Dc". Similar to how texture compression had been part of the Direct3D specification for years and was used for compressing regular textures, normal map compression compacted this new type of surface detail layer. Because DirectX Texture Compression (DXTC) was block-based and not designed for a normal map's different data properties, a new compression method was needed to prevent loss of detail and other artifacting. 3Dc was based on a modified DXT5 mode, which in fact was a fallback option for hardware not supporting 3Dc. Software making heavy use of normal mapping could gain a significant speed boost from the savings in fillrate and bandwidth by using 3Dc. ATI showcased many of their chip's new features in the promotional real-time demo called, Ruby: The Doublecross.

Most of the rest of the GPU was extremely similar to R300. The memory controller and memory bandwidth optimization techniques (HyperZ) were identical.

R420 was actually a secondary 4th generation project for ATI, with the original R400 plan, internally codenamed "Crayola", being scrapped. R400 would have been more feature-complete, with unified Shader Model 3 shader support among other enhancements, but it is believed that ATI deemed R400 unnecessarily complex for the applications that would be available, and potentially risky to develop on the available semiconductor manufacturing processes of the time. The R400 architecture was thus implemented only in the Xenos chip used in the Xbox 360 video game console, and became the base for the Qualcomm Adreno 200 mobile GPU, initially called the AMD Z430. In the Radeon line, the support for Direct3D 9.0c features moved to the subsequent generation based on the R500 architecture, while the 4th generation was served with the R300-derived R420.

== Releases of the R420 and the next ATI GPU without major architecture modification ==
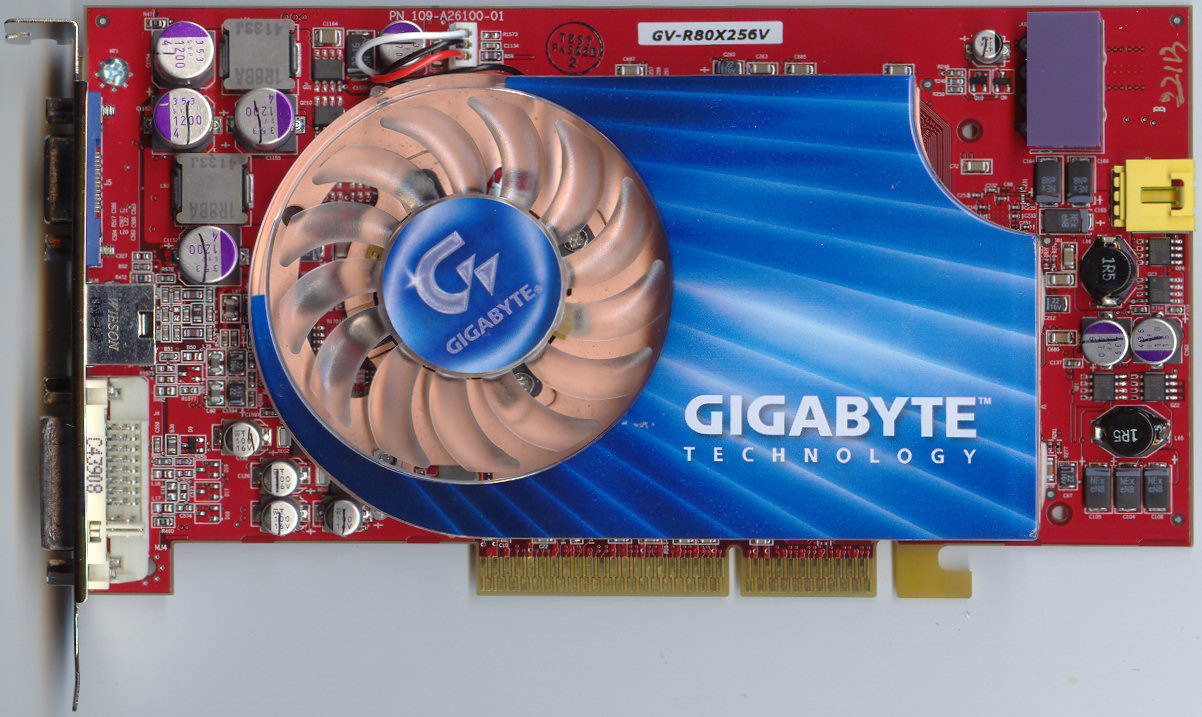
A Gigabyte Radeon X800 XT PE

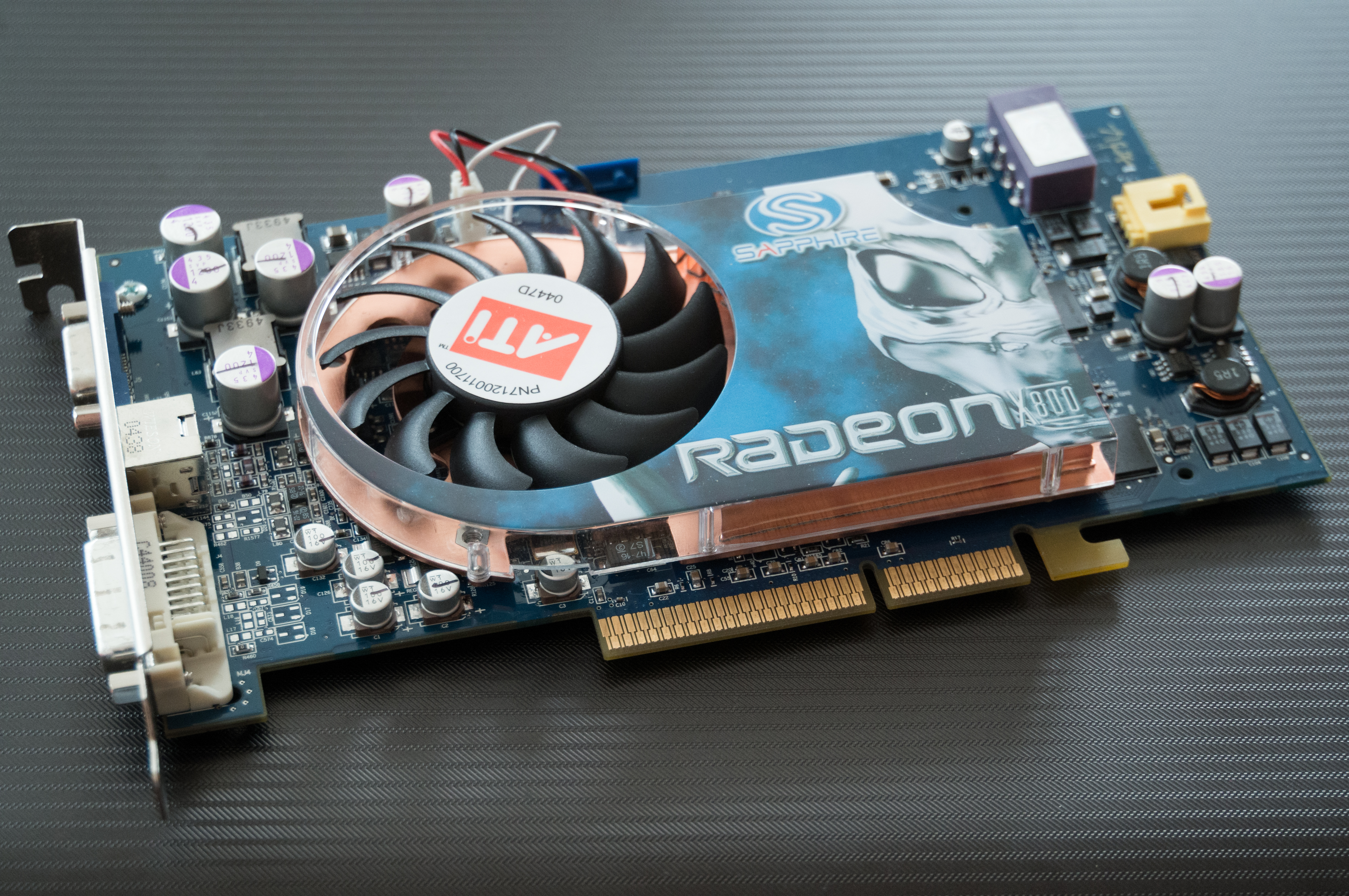
A Sapphire Radeon X800 Pro

The earliest Radeon X800 series cards were based on the R420 core. The line included the Radeon X800 XT Platinum Edition and the Radeon X800 Pro. The X800 XT PE came clocked at 520 MHz core and 560 MHz RAM, with 16 pipelines enabled. The X800 Pro came clocked at 475/450 MHz with one quad disabled, leaving 12 pixel pipelines functional. Essentially, the X800 Pro is built on semi-defective R420 cores. An X800 Pro VIVO (Video-in-Video-out) was also released and was popular with overclockers because the disabled quad could usually be enabled, resulting in a fully functional X800 XT PE at a lower cost.

The Radeon X700 (RV410) series replaced the X600 in September 2004. X700 Pro is clocked at 425 MHz core, and produced on a 0.11 micrometre process. RV410 used a layout consisting of 8 pixel pipelines connected to 4 ROPs (similar to GeForce 6600) while maintaining the 6 vertex shaders of X800. The 110 nm process was a cost-cutting process, designed not for high clock speeds but for reducing die size while maintaining high yields. An X700 XT was planned for production, and reviewed by various hardware web sites, but was never released. It was believed that X700 XT set too high of a clock ceiling for ATI to profitably produce. X700 XT was also not adequately competitive with nVidia's impressive GeForce 6600GT. ATI would go on produce a card in the X800 series to compete instead.

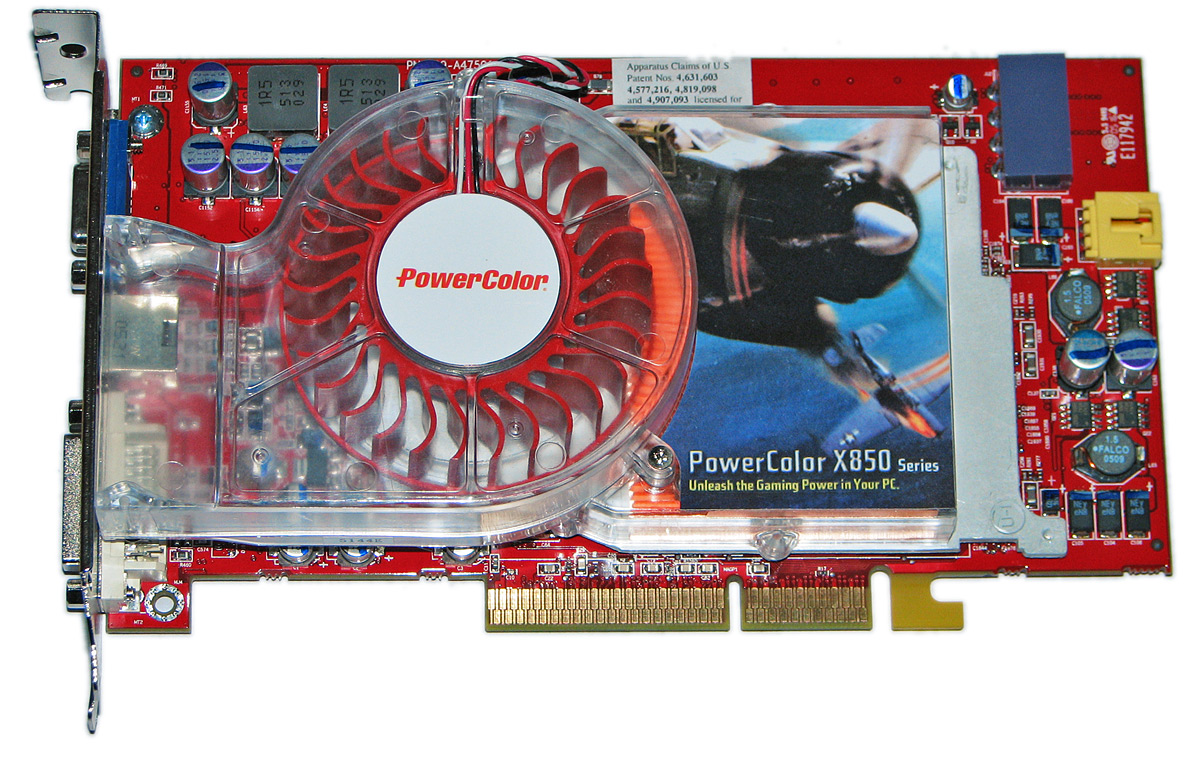
A PowerColor Radeon X850 XT

The Radeon X800 "R430"-based 110 nanometer series was introduced at the end of 2004 along with ATI's new X850 cards. The X800 was designed to replace the position X700 XT failed to secure, with 12 pipelines and a 256-bit RAM bus. The card more than surpassed the 6600GT with performance similar to that of the GeForce 6800. A close relative, the new X800 XL, was positioned to dethrone NVIDIA's GeForce 6800 GT with higher memory speeds and a full 16 pipelines to boost performance. R430 was unable to reach high clock speeds, being mainly designed to reduce the cost per GPU, and so a new top-of-the-line core was still needed. The new high-end R4x0-generation arrived with the X850 series, equipped with various core tweaks for slightly higher performance than the "R420"-based X800 series. The "R480"-based X850 line was available in 3 forms: the X850 Pro, the X850 XT, and the X850 XT Platinum Edition, and was built on the reliable high-performance 130 nm Low-K process.

In 2005, ATI had a large number of dies that "worked" but not well enough to be used on the X800 or X850 series cards. So a new SKU was created, the X800 GT. It used any "R480" X850 die or "R430" X800 XL die that had 2 functional quads and could run at 475 MHz. They were meant to compete with the GeForce 6600GT beside the previous "R430"-based X800. ATI also released the X800 GTO, which was a 12 pipeline card (3 quads) using either "R480" or "R430" dies clocked at 400 MHz. This card performed between the X800 GT and the X800 XL. It was faster than the plain GeForce 6800, but slower than GeForce 6800 GT. High sales for this card were due to its relatively high performance coupled with a cost only slightly higher than the X800 GT. The overclocking community discovered that the R480-based GTO could frequently reach clock speeds near the X850 XT.

Finally, another SKU was the X800 GTO², again based on R480. It was again manufactured by Sapphire Technology, like the X800 GTO. This card usually came with a 3 quad configuration, like X800 GTO. The GTO² was unique in the GTx series because, with a BIOS change, they could almost always be turned into a full 4 quad card. Some X800 GTO² cards shipped with the full 4 quads already enabled, but of these some were R430 instead of R480 and weren't able to reach X850-like clock speeds. The final variations of the GTO series were the special GTO boards with 16 pipelines officially enabled, such as Powercolor's "R430"-based X800 GTO-16.

== Table of models ==
=== AGP (X7xx, X8xx) ===
- All models include AGP 8×

Model	Launch	Code name	Fab (nm)	Core clock (MHz)	Memory clock (MHz)	Core config^{1}	Fillrate				Memory				Performance (FLOPS)	TDP (Watts)
Model	Launch	Code name	Fab (nm)	Core clock (MHz)	Memory clock (MHz)	Core config^{1}	MOperations/s	MPixels/s	MTexels/s	MVertices/s	Size (MB)	Bandwidth (GB/s)	Bus type	Bus width (bit)	Performance (FLOPS)	TDP (Watts)
Radeon X700	Mar 2005	RV410 (alto)	110	400	350	8:6:8:8	3200	3200	3200	600	128, 256	11.2	DDR	128	?	31
Radeon X700 Pro	Mar 1, 2005	RV410 (alto)	110	425	432	8:6:8:8	3400	3400	3400	637.5	128, 256	13.824	GDDR3	128	?	39
Radeon X800 SE	Oct 2004	R420 (loki)	130	425	400	8:6:8:8	3400	6800	3400	637.5	256	25.6	GDDR3	256	?	?
Radeon X800 GT	December 6, 2005	R420 (loki)	130	475	490	8:6:8:16	3800	7600	3800	712.5	256	31.36	GDDR3	256	?	35
Radeon X800	Dec. 2004	R430	110	400	350	12:6:12:16	4800	6400	4800	600	256	22.4	GDDR3	256	?	?
Radeon X800 GTO	December 6, 2005	R420 (loki)	130	400	490	12:6:12:16	4800	6400	4800	600	256	31.36	GDDR3	256	?	31
Radeon X800 Pro	May 5, 2004	R420 (loki)	130	475	450	12:6:12:16	5700	7600	5700	712.5	256	28.8	GDDR3	256	?	49
Radeon X800 XL	February 2, 2005	R430	110	400	490	16:6:16:16	6400	6400	6400	600	256	31.36	GDDR3	256	?	57
Radeon X800 XT	May 4, 2004	R420 (loki)	130	500	500	16:6:16:16	8000	8000	8000	750	256	32	GDDR3	256	?	86
Radeon X800 XT PE	May 4, 2004	R420 (loki)	130	520	560	16:6:16:16	8320	8320	8320	780	256	35.84	GDDR3	256	?	87
Radeon X850 Pro	February 28, 2005	R481	130	507	520	12:6:12:16	6084	8112	6084	760.5	256	33.28	GDDR3	256	?	?
Radeon X850 XT	February 28, 2005	R481	130	520	540	16:6:16:16	8320	8320	8320	780	256	34.56	GDDR3	256	?	86
Radeon X850 XT PE	February 28, 2005	R481	130	540	590	16:6:16:16	8640	8640	8640	810	256	37.76	GDDR3	256	?	?

^{1} Pixel shaders : Vertex shaders : Texture mapping units : Render output units

=== PCIe (X5xx, X7xx, X8xx series) ===
- All models include PCIe ×16

Model	Launch	Code name	Fab (nm)	Core clock (MHz)	Memory clock (MHz)	Core config^{1}	Fillrate				Memory				Performance (FLOPS)	TDP (Watts)
Model	Launch	Code name	Fab (nm)	Core clock (MHz)	Memory clock (MHz)	Core config^{1}	MOperations/s	MPixels/s	MTexels/s	MVertices/s	Size (MB)	Bandwidth (GB/s)	Bus type	Bus width (bit)	Performance (FLOPS)	TDP (Watts)
Radeon X550 XT	January 24, 2007	RV410 (alto)	110	400	300	4:6:4:8	1600	3200	1600	600	128	4.8 9.6	DDR GDDR3	64 128	?	?
Radeon X550 XTX	January 24, 2007	RV410 (alto)	110	400	300	8:6:8:8	3200	3200	3200	600	128	4.8 9.6	DDR GDDR3	64 128	?	?
Radeon X700 SE	April 1, 2005	RV410 (alto)	110	400	200; 250	4:6:4:8	1600	3200	1600	600	128	3.2	DDR	64	?	?
Radeon X700 LE	December 21, 2004	RV410 (alto)	110	400	250	8:6:8:8	3200	3200	3200	600	128	4	DDR	64	?	29
Radeon X1050 (RV410)	Jan, 25, 2008	RV410 (alto)	110	400	200	8:6:8:8	3200	3200	3200	600	128, 256	6.4	DDR	128	?	20
Radeon X700	Sept. 2005	RV410 (alto)	110	400	250; 350	8:6:8:8	3200	3200	3200	600	128, 256	8; 11.2	DDR	128	?	31
Radeon X700 Pro	December 21, 2004	RV410 (alto)	110	425	432	8:6:8:8	3400	3400	3400	637.5	128, 256	13.824	GDDR3	128	?	39
Radeon X700 XT	Never Released	RV410 (alto)	110	475	525	8:6:8:8	3800	3800	3800	712.5	128, 256	16.8	GDDR3	128	?	38
Radeon X740 XL	March 7, 2005 (Medion OEM)	RV410 (alto)	110	425	450	8:6:8:8	3400	3400	3400	637.5	128	14.4	GDDR3	128	?	34
Radeon X800 GT 128 MB	August 1, 2005	R423; R480 (thor)	130	475	175	8:6:8:16	3800	7600	3800	712.5	128	22.4	DDR	256	?	32
Radeon X800 GT 256 MB	August 1, 2005	R423; R480 (thor)	130	475	490	8:6:8:16	3800	7600	3800	712.5	256	31.36	GDDR3	256	?	35
Radeon X800	December 1, 2004	R430 (thor)	110	392	350	12:6:12:16	4704	6272	4704	588	128, 256	22.4	GDDR3	256	?	?
Radeon X800 GTO 128 MB	September 15, 2005	R423; R480; R430 (thor)	130; 110	400	350	12:6:12:16	4800	6400	4800	600	128	22.4	GDDR3	256	?	30
Radeon X800 GTO 256 MB	September 15, 2005	R423; R480; R430 (thor)	130; 110	400	490	12:6:12:16	4800	6400	4800	600	256	31.36	GDDR3	256	?	31
Radeon X800 Pro	May 5, 2004	R423 (thor)	130	475	450	12:6:12:16	5700	7600	5700	712.5	256	28.8	GDDR3	256	?	49
Radeon X800 XL	December 1, 2004 (256 MB); May 4, 2005 (512 MB)	R430 (thor)	110	400	490	16:6:16:16	6400	6400	6400	600	256, 512	31.36	GDDR3	256	?	56
Radeon X800 XT	December 1, 2004	R423 (thor)	130	500	500	16:6:16:16	8000	8000	8000	750	256	32	GDDR3	256	?	83
Radeon X800 XT Platinum Edition	May 5, 2004	R423 (thor)	130	520	560	16:6:16:16	8320	8320	8320	780	256	35.84	GDDR3	256	?	88
Radeon X850 Pro	December 1, 2004	R480 (thor)	130	507	520	12:6:12:16	6084	8112	6084	760.5	256	33.28	GDDR3	256	?	?
Radeon X850 XT	December 1, 2004	R480 (thor)	130	520	540	16:6:16:16	8320	8320	8320	780	256	34.56	GDDR3	256	?	86
Radeon X850 XT CrossFire Master	September 29, 2004	R480 (thor)	130	520	540	16:6:16:16	8320	8320	8320	780	256	34.56	GDDR3	256	?	?
Radeon X850 XT Platinum Edition	December 21, 2004	R480 (thor)	130	540	590	16:6:16:16	8640	8640	8640	810	256	37.76	GDDR3	256	?	?
Model	Launch	Code name	Fab (nm)	Core clock (MHz)	Memory clock (MHz)	Core config^{1}	MOperations/s	MPixels/s	MTexels/s	MVertices/s	Size (MB)	Bandwidth (GB/s)	Bus type	Bus width (bit)	Performance (FLOPS)	TDP (Watts)
Model	Launch	Code name	Fab (nm)	Core clock (MHz)	Memory clock (MHz)	Core config^{1}	Fillrate				Memory				Performance (FLOPS)	TDP (Watts)

^{1} Pixel shaders : Vertex Shaders : Texture mapping units : Render output units

=== IGP (X2xx, 11xx series) ===
- Based on the Radeon X300

Model	Launch	Code name	Fab (nm)	Bus interface	Core clock (MHz)	Memory clock (MHz)	Core config^{1}	Fillrate				Memory			
Model	Launch	Code name	Fab (nm)	Bus interface	Core clock (MHz)	Memory clock (MHz)	Core config^{1}	MOperations/s	MPixels/s	MTexels/s	MVertices/s	Size (MiB)	Bandwidth (GB/s)	Bus type	Bus width (bit)
Radeon Xpress X200	November 8, 2004	RS480 (metallo)	130	HT	300	200-400 (DDR), 200 (sideport)	4:2:2:2	600	600	600	0	16-128 system + 16 sideport	1.6-6.4 system + 0.8 sideport	DDR	64, 128
Radeon Xpress 1100 (originally Xpress 200)	2005	RS482 (grayskull)	110	HT	300	200-400 (DDR), 400-800 (DDR2)	4:2:2:2	600	600	600	0	16-128 system	1.6- 12.8 system	DDR, DDR2	64, 128
Radeon Xpress 1150 (originally Xpress 200 for Intel)	March 11, 2005 (Intel), May 23, 2006 (AMD)	RC400, RC410, RS400, RS415, RS485	110	HT, FSB	400	200-400 (DDR), 400-800 (DDR2)	4:2:2:2	800	800	800	0	16-128 system	1.6-12.8	DDR, DDR2	64, 128

^{1}Pixel shaders : Vertex Shaders : Texture mapping units : Render output units

=== Mobile GPUs ===
These GPUs are either integrated into the mainboard or occupy a Mobile PCI Express Module (MXM).

==== Mobility Radeon series ====
Model	Launch	Model number	Code name	Fab (nm)	Bus interface	Core clock (MHz)	Memory clock (MHz)	Core config^{1}	Fillrate		Memory				API compliance (version)		Notes
Model	Launch	Model number	Code name	Fab (nm)	Bus interface	Core clock (MHz)	Memory clock (MHz)	Core config^{1}	Pixel (GP/s)	Texture (GT/s)	Size (MB)	Bandwidth (GB/s)	Bus type	Bus width (bit)	Direct3D	OpenGL	Notes
Mobility Radeon 9800	Sep 2004	M18	R420	130	AGP 8×	350	300	4:8:8:8	2.8	2.8	256	DDR	19.2	256	9.0	2.0	

^{1} Vertex shaders : Pixel shaders : Texture mapping units : Render output units.

==== Mobility Radeon X700, X800 series ====
Model	Launch	Model number	Code name	Fab (nm)	Bus interface	Core clock (MHz)	Memory clock (MHz)	Core config^{1}	Fillrate		Memory				API compliance (version)		Notes
Model	Launch	Model number	Code name	Fab (nm)	Bus interface	Core clock (MHz)	Memory clock (MHz)	Core config^{1}	Pixel (GP/s)	Texture (GT/s)	Size (MB)	Bandwidth (GB/s)	Bus type	Bus width (bit)	Direct3D	OpenGL	Notes
Mobility Radeon X700	Mar 2005	M26	RV410	110	PCIe ×16	400-100 (PowerPlay)	350-200	6:8:8:4	1.4	2.8	Shared-128? 64, 128	11.2	DDR, GDDR3	128	9.0b	2.0	3DC, dynamic lane count switching
Mobility Radeon X800	Nov 2004	M28	R423	130	PCIe ×16	400	400	6:12:12:12	4.8	4.8	256	25.6	GDDR3	256	9.0b	2.0	3DC, DLCS, Clock Gating
Mobility Radeon X800 XT	Jun 2005	M28 PRO	R423	130	PCIe ×16	480	550	6:16:16:16	7.68	7.68	256	35.2	GDDR3	256	9.0b	2.0	3DC, DLCS, Clock Gating

^{1} Vertex shaders : Pixel shaders : Texture mapping units : Render output units.
