= RDNA 2 =

GPU microarchitecture by AMD released in 2020

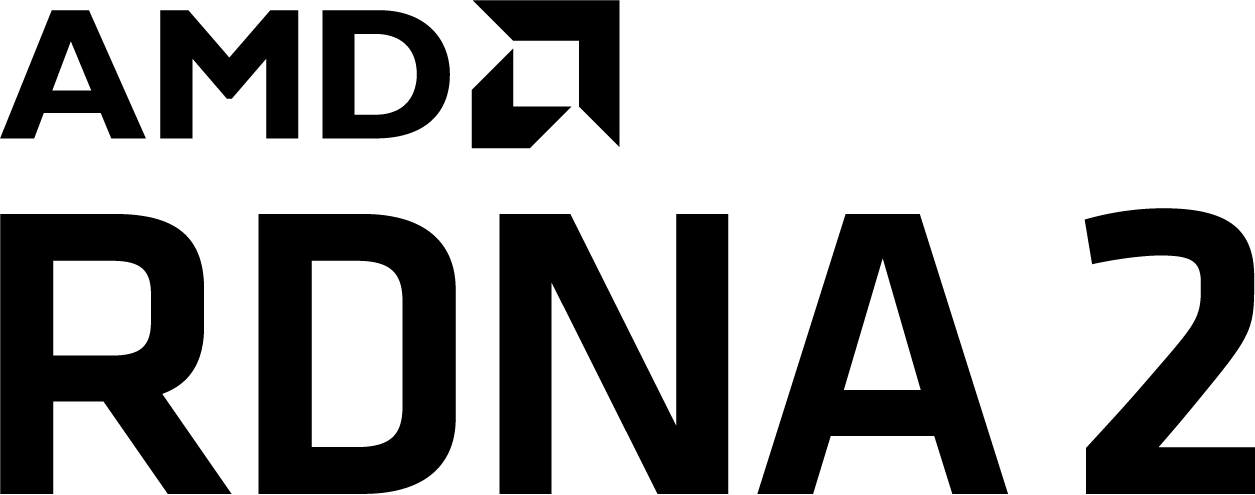
- Launched: November 18, 2020; 5 years ago
- Designed by: AMD
- Manufactured by: TSMC
- Fabrication process: TSMC N6; TSMC N7
- Codenames: Navi 2x; "Big Navi"

Product Series
- Desktop: Radeon RX 6000 series
- Professional/workstation: Radeon Pro W6000 series

Specifications
- L0 cache: 32 KB (per WGP): 16 KB vector data; 16 KB scalar data
- L1 cache: 128 KB (per array)
- L2 cache: 1 MB to 4 MB
- L3 cache: 16 MB to 128 MB
- Memory support: GDDR6
- Memory clock rate: 14–18 Gbps
- PCIe support: PCIe 4.0

Supported Graphics APIs
- Direct3D: Direct3D 12.0 Ultimate (feature level 12_2)
- Shader Model: Shader Model 6.7
- OpenGL: OpenGL 4.6
- Vulkan: Vulkan 1.3

Supported Compute APIs
- OpenCL: OpenCL 2.1

Media Engine
- Encode codecs: H.264; H.265
- Decode codecs: H.264; H.265; AV1
- Color bit-depth: 8-bit; 10-bit
- Encoders supported: AMF; VCE
- Display outputs: DisplayPort 1.4a; HDMI 2.1; USB-C

History
- Predecessor: RDNA
- Variant: CDNA 2 (datacenter)
- Successor: RDNA 3

Support status
- Supported

RDNA 2 is a GPU microarchitecture designed by AMD, released with the Radeon RX 6000 series on November 18, 2020. Alongside powering the RX 6000 series, RDNA 2 is also featured in the SoCs designed by AMD for the PlayStation 5, Xbox Series X/S, and Steam Deck consoles.

== Background ==
On July 7, 2019, AMD released the first iteration of the RDNA microarchitecture, a new graphics architecture designed specifically for gaming that replaced the aging Graphics Core Next (GCN) microarchitecture. With RDNA, AMD sought to reduce latency and improve power efficiency over their previous Vega series based on GCN 5th gen and Nvidia's competing Turing microarchitecture.

RDNA 2 was first publicly announced in January 2020 with AMD initially calling RDNA 2 a "refresh" of the original RDNA architecture from the previous year. At AMD's Financial Analysts Day held on March 5, 2020, AMD showed a client GPU roadmap that gave details on RDNA's successor, RDNA 2, that it would again be built using TSMC's 7 nm process and would be coming in 2020. AMD told their investors that they were targeting a 50% uplift in performance-per-watt and increased IPC with the RDNA 2 microarchitecture.

On October 28, 2020, AMD held an online unveiling event for the RDNA 2 architecture and Radeon RX 6000 series. The event came 20 days after AMD's unveiling event for Ryzen 5000 series processors built on the Zen 3 microarchitecture.

== Architectural details ==
=== Compute Unit ===
RDNA 2 contains a significant increase in the number of Compute Units (CUs) with a maximum of 80, a doubling from the maximum of 40 in the Radeon RX 5700 XT. Each Compute Unit contains 64 shader cores. CUs are organized into groups of two named Work Group Processors with 32 KB of shared L0 cache per WGP. Each CU contains two sets of an SIMD32 vector unit, an SISD scalar unit, textures units, and a stack of various caches. New low precision data types like INT4 and INT8 are new supported data types for RDNA 2 CUs.

The RDNA 2 graphics pipeline has been reconfigured and reordered for greater performance-per-watt and more efficient rendering by moving the caches closer to the shader engines. A new mesh shaders model allows shader rendering to be done in parallel using smaller batches of primitives called "meshlets". As a result, the mesh shaders feature enables greater control of the GPU geometry pipeline.

=== Ray tracing ===
Real-time hardware accelerated ray tracing is a new feature for RDNA 2 which is handled by a dedicated ray accelerator inside each CU. Ray tracing on RDNA 2 relies on the more open DirectX Raytracing protocol rather than the Nvidia RTX protocol.

In February 2023, it was reported that driver updates had boosted ray tracing performance by up to 40% using DirectX Raytracing.

=== Clock speeds ===
With RDNA 2 using the same 7 nm node as RDNA, AMD claims that RDNA 2 achieves a 30% frequency increase over its predecessor while using the same power.

=== Cache and memory subsystem ===
In addition to the traditional L1 and L2 caches that GPUs possess, RDNA 2 adds a new global L3 cache that AMD calls "Infinity Cache". This was done to avoid the use of a wider memory bus while still being able to maintain the same data bandwidth. Product technology architect Sam Naffziger said that, without Infinity Cache, "We were looking at the daunting prospect of having to put a 512-bit interface and all the power, area and expense associated with that". Using a wider memory bus requires more power which is in conflict with AMD's increased performance-per-watt goals for RDNA 2. AMD engineers ran tests comparing RDNA 2 silicon featuring a large on-die cache and with wider memory buses. They discovered that having such a cache would aid in the re-use of temporal and spatial data when the GPU is rendering a complex image. It is beneficial for the GPU's compute units to have fast access to a physically close cache rather than searching for data in video memory. AMD claims that RDNA 2's 128 MB of on-die Infinity Cache "dramatically reduces latency and power consumption". The GPU having access to a large L2 or L3 cache allows it to more quickly access necessary data compared to accessing VRAM or system RAM. The Infinity Cache is made up of two sets of 64 MB cache that can run on its own clock rate independent from the GPU cores. The Infinity Cache has a peak internal transfer bandwidth of 1986.6 GB/s and results in less reliance being placed on the GPU's GDDR6 memory controllers. Each Shader Engine now has two sets of L1 caches. The large cache of RDNA 2 GPUs give them a higher overall memory bandwidth compared to Nvidia's GeForce RTX 30 series GPUs.

=== Power efficiency ===
AMD claims that RDNA 2 achieves up to a 54% increase in performance-per-watt over the first RDNA microarchitecture. 21% of that 54% improvement is attributed to performance-per-clock enhancements, in part due to the addition of Infinity Cache.

=== Media engine ===
RDNA 2 uses the VCN 3.0, VCN 3.1, and VCN 3.1.2 video decoding blocks in its media engine. It adds support for AV1 decoding at up to 8K resolution, though AV1 hardware encoding support would not come until RDNA 3 in 2022. However, the low-end Navi 24 die and iGPUs based on RDNA 2.0 do not contain any media encoders and cannot decode AV1 as a result.

== Navi 2x dies ==
		Navi 21	Navi 22	Navi 23	Navi 24
Launch		Nov 18, 2020	Mar 18, 2021	Aug 11, 2021	Jan 19, 2022
Codename		Sienna Cichlid	Navy Flounder	Dimgrey Cavefish	Beige Goby
Compute units (Stream processors) [FP32 cores]		80 (5120) [10240]	40 (2560) [5120]	32 (2048) [4096]	16 (1024) [2048]
Process		TSMC N7			TSMC N6
Transistors		26.8B	17.2B	11.06B	5.4B
Transistor density		51.5 MTr/mm^{2}	51.3 MTr/mm^{2}	46.7 MTr/mm^{2}	50.5 MTr/mm^{2}
Die size		520 mm^{2}	335 mm^{2}	237 mm^{2}	107 mm^{2}
Max TDP		400 W	250 W	176 W	107 W
Products	Desktop	RX 6800; RX 6800 XT; RX 6900 XT; RX 6950 XT	RX 6700; RX 6700 XT; RX 6750 XT	RX 6600; RX 6600 XT; RX 6650 XT	RX 6300; RX 6400; RX 6500 XT
Products	Mobile	—N/a	RX 6800M; RX 6850M XT	RX 6600S; RX 6600M; RX 6650M; RX 6650M XT; RX 6700S	RX 6300M; RX 6450M; RX 6500M; RX 6550S; RX 6550M
Products	Workstation (desktop)	W6800; W6800X; W6800X Duo; W6900X	—N/a	W6600; W6600X	W6300; W6400
Products	Workstation (mobile)	—N/a	—N/a	W6600M	W6300M; W6500M

== Products ==
=== Desktop ===
Model (Code name)	Release Date & Price	Architecture & fab	Transistors & die size	Core		Fillrate (Note: Boost values (if available) are stated below the base value in italic.) (Note: Texture fillrate is calculated as the number of Texture Mapping Units multiplied by the base (or boost) core clock speed.) (Note: Pixel fillrate is calculated as the number of Render Output Units multiplied by the base (or boost) core clock speed.)		Processing power (Note: Precision performance is calculated from the base (or boost) core clock speed based on a FMA operation.) (GFLOPS)			Infinity Cache		Memory				TBP	Bus interface
Model (Code name)	Release Date & Price	Architecture & fab	Transistors & die size	Config (Note: Unified shaders : Texture mapping units : Render output units : Ray accelerators and Compute units (CU))	Clock (MHz)	Texture (GT/s)	Pixel (GP/s)	Half	Single	Double	Size	Bandwidth (GB/s)	Size	Bandwidth (GB/s)	Bus type & width	Clock (MT/s)	TBP	Bus interface
Radeon RX 6300 (Navi 24) (Note: Navi 24 lacks hardware video encoder.)	Jan 4, 2022 (Note: Actual release date unknown; RX 6300M release date is listed instead.); OEM	RDNA 2 TSMC N6	5.4×10^{9} 107 mm^{2}	768:48:32:12; 12 CU	1000; 2040	48; 97.9	32; 65.3	3,072; 6,267	1536; 3,133	96; 195.8	8 MB	104	2 GB	64	GDDR6; 32-bit	16000	32 W	PCIe 4.0 ×4
Radeon RX 6400 (Navi 24)	Jan 19, 2022 $159 USD	RDNA 2 TSMC N6	5.4×10^{9} 107 mm^{2}	768:48:32:12; 12 CU	1923; 2321	92.3; 111.4	61.5; 74.3	5,907; 7,130	2,954; 3,565	184.6; 222.8	16 MB	208	4 GB	128	GDDR6; 64-bit	16000	53 W	PCIe 4.0 ×4
Radeon RX 6500 XT (Navi 24)	Jan 19, 2022 $199 USD (4GB) $219 USD (8GB)	RDNA 2 TSMC N6	5.4×10^{9} 107 mm^{2}	1024:64:32:16; 16 CU	2310; 2815	147.8; 180.2	73.9; 90.1	9,462; 11,530	4,731; 5,765	295.6; 360.3	16 MB	232	4 GB; 8 GB	144	GDDR6; 64-bit	18000	107 W 113 W	PCIe 4.0 ×4
Radeon RX 6600 (Navi 23)	Oct 13, 2021 $329 USD	RDNA 2 TSMC N7	11.06×10^{9} 237 mm^{2}	1792:112:64:28; 28 CU	1626; 2491	182.3; 279	104.1; 159.4	11,658; 17,860	5,828; 8,928	364.2; 558	32 MB	412.9	8 GB	224	GDDR6; 128-bit	14000	132 W	PCIe 4.0 ×8
Radeon RX 6600 XT (Navi 23)	Aug 11, 2021 $379 USD	RDNA 2 TSMC N7	11.06×10^{9} 237 mm^{2}	2048:128:64:32; 32 CU	1968; 2589	251.9; 331.4	126; 165.7	16,122; 21,209	8,061; 10,605	503.8; 662.8	32 MB	444.9	8 GB	256	GDDR6; 128-bit	16000	160 W	PCIe 4.0 ×8
Radeon RX 6650 XT (Navi 23)	May 10, 2022 $399 USD	RDNA 2 TSMC N7	11.06×10^{9} 237 mm^{2}	2048:128:64:32; 32 CU	2055; 2635	263; 337.2	131.5; 168.6	16,835; 21,586	8,417; 10,793	526.1; 674.6	32 MB	468.9	8 GB	280	GDDR6; 128-bit	17500	180 W	PCIe 4.0 ×8
Radeon RX 6700 (Navi 22)	Jun 9, 2021	RDNA 2 TSMC N7	17.2×10^{9} 335 mm^{2}	2304:144:64:36; 36 CU	1941; 2450	279.5; 352.8	124.2; 156.8	17,888; 22,579	8,944; 11,290	559; 705.6	80 MB	1065	10 GB	320	GDDR6; 160-bit	16000	175 W	PCIe 4.0 ×16
Radeon RX 6750 GRE 10GB (Navi 22)	Oct 18, 2023 $269 USD	RDNA 2 TSMC N7	17.2×10^{9} 335 mm^{2}	2304:144:64:36; 36 CU	1941; 2450	279.5; 352.8	124.2; 156.8	17,888; 22,579	8,944; 11,290	559; 705.6	80 MB	1065	10 GB	320	GDDR6; 160-bit	16000	170 W	PCIe 4.0 ×16
Radeon RX 6700 XT (Navi 22)	Mar 18, 2021 $479 USD	RDNA 2 TSMC N7	17.2×10^{9} 335 mm^{2}	2560:160:64:40; 40 CU	2321; 2581	371.4; 413	148.5; 165.2	23,767; 26,429	11,884; 13,215	742.7; 825.9	96 MB	1278	12 GB	384	GDDR6; 192-bit	16000	230 W	PCIe 4.0 ×16
Radeon RX 6750 GRE 12GB (Navi 22)	Oct 18, 2023 $289 USD	RDNA 2 TSMC N7	17.2×10^{9} 335 mm^{2}	2560:160:64:40; 40 CU	2321; 2581	371.4; 413	148.5; 165.2	23,767; 26,429	11,884; 13,215	742.7; 825.9	96 MB	1278	12 GB	384	GDDR6; 192-bit	16000	230 W	PCIe 4.0 ×16
Radeon RX 6750 XT (Navi 22)	May 10, 2022 $549 USD	RDNA 2 TSMC N7	17.2×10^{9} 335 mm^{2}	2560:160:64:40; 40 CU	2150; 2600	344; 416	137.6; 166.4	22,016; 26,624	11,008; 13,312	688; 832	96 MB	1326	12 GB	432	GDDR6; 192-bit	18000	250 W	PCIe 4.0 ×16
Radeon RX 6800 (Navi 21)	Nov 18, 2020 $579 USD	RDNA 2 TSMC N7	26.8×10^{9} 520 mm^{2}	3840:240:96:60; 60 CU	1700; 2105	408; 505.2	163.2; 202.1	26,112; 32,333	13,056; 16,166	816; 1,010	128 MB	1432.6	16 GB	512	GDDR6; 256-bit	16000	250 W	PCIe 4.0 ×16
Radeon RX 6800 XT (Navi 21)	Nov 18, 2020 $649 USD	RDNA 2 TSMC N7	26.8×10^{9} 520 mm^{2}	4608:288:128:72; 72 CU	1825; 2250	525.6; 648	233.6; 288	33,638; 41,472	16,819; 20,736	1,051; 1,296	128 MB	1664.2	16 GB	512	GDDR6; 256-bit	16000	300 W	PCIe 4.0 ×16
Radeon RX 6900 XT (Navi 21)	Dec 8, 2020 $999 USD	RDNA 2 TSMC N7	26.8×10^{9} 520 mm^{2}	5120:320:128:80; 80 CU	1825; 2250	584; 720	233.6; 288	37,376; 46,080	18,688; 23,040	1,168; 1,440	128 MB	1664.2	16 GB	512	GDDR6; 256-bit	16000	300 W	PCIe 4.0 ×16
Radeon RX 6950 XT (Navi 21)	May 10, 2022 $1,099 USD	RDNA 2 TSMC N7	26.8×10^{9} 520 mm^{2}	5120:320:128:80; 80 CU	1890; 2310	604.8; 739.2	241.9; 295.7	38,707; 47,309	19,354; 23,654	1,210; 1,478	128 MB	1793.5	16 GB	576	GDDR6; 256-bit	18000	335 W	PCIe 4.0 ×16

=== Mobile ===
Model (Code name)	Release date	Architecture & fab	Transistors & die size	Core		Fillrate (Note: Boost values (if available) are stated below the base value in italic.) (Note: Texture fillrate is calculated as the number of Texture Mapping Units multiplied by the base (or boost) core clock speed.) (Note: Pixel fillrate is calculated as the number of Render Output Units multiplied by the base (or boost) core clock speed.)		Processing power (Note: Precision performance is calculated from the base (or boost) core clock speed based on a FMA operation.) (GFLOPS)			Infinity Cache	Memory				HW Decoder			HW Encoder			TDP	Bus interface
Model (Code name)	Release date	Architecture & fab	Transistors & die size	Config (Note: Unified shaders : Texture mapping units : Render output units : Ray accelerators and Compute units CU)	Clock (MHz)	Texture (GT/s)	Pixel (GP/s)	Half	Single	Double	Infinity Cache	Size	Bandwidth (GB/s)	Bus type & width	Clock (MT/s)	AV1	H265	4K H264	AV1	H265	4K H264	TDP	Bus interface
Radeon RX 6300M (Navi 24) (Note: Lacks hardware video encoder.)	Jan 4, 2022	RDNA 2 TSMC N6	5.4×10^{9} 107 mm^{2}	768:64:32:12; 12 CU	1512	97.76	48.38	6,270	3,130	195.6	8 MB	2 GB	64	GDDR6; 32-bit	16000	No	Yes	Yes	No	No	No	25 W	PCIe 4.0 ×4
Radeon RX 6450M (Navi 24)	Jan 4, 2023	RDNA 2 TSMC N6	5.4×10^{9} 107 mm^{2}	768:64:32:12; 12 CU	2220	118.10	71.04	7,600	3,780	236.3	16 MB	4 GB	128	GDDR6; 64-bit	16000	No	Yes	Yes	No	No	No	50 W	PCIe 4.0 ×4
Radeon RX 6550S (Navi 24)	Jan 4, 2023	RDNA 2 TSMC N6	5.4×10^{9} 107 mm^{2}	1024:64:32:16; 16 CU	2170	154.20	69.44	9,900	4,900	306.3	16 MB	4 GB	128	GDDR6; 64-bit	16000	No	Yes	Yes	No	No	No	50 W	PCIe 4.0 ×4
Radeon RX 6500M (Navi 24)	Jan 4, 2022	RDNA 2 TSMC N6	5.4×10^{9} 107 mm^{2}	1024:64:32:16; 16 CU	2191	155.7	70.11	9,970	4,980	311.2	16 MB	4 GB	128	GDDR6; 64-bit	16000	No	Yes	Yes	No	No	No	50 W	PCIe 4.0 ×4
Radeon RX 6550M (Navi 24)	Jan 4, 2023	RDNA 2 TSMC N6	5.4×10^{9} 107 mm^{2}	1024:64:32:16; 16 CU	2560	182.10	81.92	11,600	5,800	362.5	16 MB	4 GB	144	GDDR6; 64-bit	18000	No	Yes	Yes	No	No	No	80 W	PCIe 4.0 ×4
Radeon RX 6600S (Navi 23)	Jan 4, 2022	RDNA 2 TSMC N7	11.06×10^{9} 237 mm^{2}	1792:128:64:28; 28 CU	1881	244.2	120.3	15,630	7,810	448.1	32 MB	4 GB	224	GDDR6; 128-bit	14000	Yes	Yes	Yes	No	Yes	Yes	80 W	PCIe 4.0 ×8
Radeon RX 6700S (Navi 23)	Jan 4, 2022	RDNA 2 TSMC N7	11.06×10^{9} 237 mm^{2}	1792:128:64:28; 28 CU	1890	247.5	120.9	15,840	7,920	495.0	32 MB	8 GB	224	GDDR6; 128-bit	14000	Yes	Yes	Yes	No	Yes	Yes	80 W	PCIe 4.0 ×8
Radeon RX 6600M (Navi 23)	May 31, 2021	RDNA 2 TSMC N7	11.06×10^{9} 237 mm^{2}	1792:128:64:28; 28 CU	2177	274.2	139.3	17,550	7,800	487.5	32 MB	8 GB	224	GDDR6; 128-bit	14000	Yes	Yes	Yes	No	Yes	Yes	100 W	PCIe 4.0 ×8
Radeon RX 6650M (Navi 23)	Jan 4, 2022	RDNA 2 TSMC N7	11.06×10^{9} 237 mm^{2}	1792:128:64:28; 28 CU	2222	276.6	139.3	17,700	8,850	553.1	32 MB	8 GB	256	GDDR6; 128-bit	16000	Yes	Yes	Yes	No	Yes	Yes	120 W	PCIe 4.0 ×8
Radeon RX 6800S (Navi 23)	Jan 4, 2022	RDNA 2 TSMC N7	11.06×10^{9} 237 mm^{2}	2048:128:64:32; 32 CU	1975	288.0	134.4	18,430	9,220	576.5	32 MB	8 GB	256	GDDR6; 128-bit	16000	Yes	Yes	Yes	No	Yes	Yes	100 W	PCIe 4.0 ×8
Radeon RX 6650M XT (Navi 23)	Jan 4, 2022	RDNA 2 TSMC N7	11.06×10^{9} 237 mm^{2}	2048:128:64:32; 32 CU	2162	311.5	142.2	19,940	9,970	623.1	32 MB	8 GB	256	GDDR6; 128-bit	16000	Yes	Yes	Yes	No	Yes	Yes	120 W	PCIe 4.0 ×8
Radeon RX 6700M (Navi 22)	May 31, 2021	RDNA 2 TSMC N7	17.2×10^{9} 335 mm^{2}	2304:144:64:36; 36 CU	2300	331.4	147.2	21,209	10,605	662.1	80 MB	10 GB	320	GDDR6; 160-bit	16000	Yes	Yes	Yes	No	Yes	Yes	135 W	PCIe 4.0 ×16
Radeon RX 6800M (Navi 22)	May 31, 2021	RDNA 2 TSMC N7	17.2×10^{9} 335 mm^{2}	2560:160:64:40; 40 CU	2300	368.0	147.2	23,550	11,780	736.2	96 MB	12 GB	384	GDDR6; 192-bit	16000	Yes	Yes	Yes	No	Yes	Yes	145+ W	PCIe 4.0 ×16
Radeon RX 6850M XT (Navi 22)	Jan 4, 2022	RDNA 2 TSMC N7	17.2×10^{9} 335 mm^{2}	2560:160:64:40; 40 CU	2580	415.6	157.6	26,430	13,209	825.6	96 MB	12 GB	432	GDDR6; 192-bit	18000	Yes	Yes	Yes	No	Yes	Yes	165 W	PCIe 4.0 ×16

=== Workstation ===
==== Desktop Workstation ====
Model (Code name)	Release date & price	Architecture & fab	Transistors & die size	Core		Fillrate (Note: Boost values (if available) are stated below the base value in italic.) (Note: Texture fillrate is calculated as the number of Texture Mapping Units multiplied by the base (or boost) core clock speed.) (Note: Pixel fillrate is calculated as the number of Render Output Units multiplied by the base (or boost) core clock speed.)		Processing power (Note: Precision performance is calculated from the base (or boost) core clock speed based on a FMA operation.) (GFLOPS)			Infinity Cache	Memory				TDP	Bus interface	Graphic output ports
Model (Code name)	Release date & price	Architecture & fab	Transistors & die size	Config (Note: Unified shaders : Texture mapping units : Render output units : Ray accelerators and Compute units (CU))	Clock (MHz)	Texture (GT/s)	Pixel (GP/s)	Half	Single	Double	Infinity Cache	Size (GB)	Bandwidth (GB/s)	Bus type & width	Clock (MT/s)	TDP	Bus interface	Graphic output ports
Radeon Pro W6300 (Navi 24)	Oct 2022; OEM	RDNA 2 TSMC N6	5.4×10^{9} 107 mm^{2}	768:48:32:12; 12 CU	1512; 2040	72.58; 97.92	48.38; 65.28	4,644; 6,267	2,322; 3,133	145.1; 195.8	8 MB	2	64	GDDR6; 32-bit	16000	25 W	PCIe 4.0 ×4	2× DP 1.4a
Radeon Pro W6400 (Navi 24)	Jan 19, 2022 $229 USD	RDNA 2 TSMC N6	5.4×10^{9} 107 mm^{2}	768:48:32:12; 12 CU	2039; 2331	97.87; 111.9	65.25; 74.59	6,264; 7,161	3,132; 3,580	195.7; 223.8	16 MB	4	128	GDDR6; 64-bit	16000	50 W	PCIe 4.0 ×4	2× DP 1.4a
Radeon Pro W6600 (Navi 23)	Jun 8, 2021 $649 USD	RDNA 2 TSMC N7	11.06×10^{9} 237 mm^{2}	1792:112:64:28; 28 CU	2331; 2903	261.1; 325.1	149.2; 185.8	16,709; 20,809	8,354; 10,404	522.1; 650.3	32 MB	8	224	GDDR6; 128-bit	14000	130 W	PCIe 4.0 ×8	4× DP 1.4a
Radeon Pro W6800 (Navi 21)	Jun 8, 2021 $2249 USD	RDNA 2 TSMC N7	26.8×10^{9} 520 mm^{2}	3840:240:96:60; 60 CU	2075; 2320	498.0; 556.8	199.2; 222.7	31,872; 35,635	15,936; 17,818	996.0; 1,114	128 MB	32	512	GDDR6; 256-bit	16000	250 W	PCIe 4.0 ×16	6× miniDP 1.4a

Model (Code name)	Release date	Architecture & fab	Transistors & die size	Core		Fillrate (Note: Boost values (if available) are stated below the base value in italic.) (Note: Texture fillrate is calculated as the number of Texture Mapping Units multiplied by the base (or boost) core clock speed.) (Note: Pixel fillrate is calculated as the number of Render Output Units multiplied by the base (or boost) core clock speed.)		Processing power (Note: Precision performance is calculated from the base (or boost) core clock speed based on a FMA operation.) (GFLOPS)			Infinity Cache	Memory				TDP	Bus interface	Graphic output ports
Model (Code name)	Release date	Architecture & fab	Transistors & die size	Config (Note: Unified shaders : Texture mapping units : Render output units : Ray accelerators and Compute units (CU))	Clock (MHz)	Texture (GT/s)	Pixel (GP/s)	Half	Single	Double	Infinity Cache	Size (GB)	Bandwidth (GB/s)	Bus type & width	Clock (MT/s)	TDP	Bus interface	Graphic output ports
Radeon Pro W6600X (Navi 23)	Mar 8, 2022	RDNA 2 TSMC N7	11.06×10^{9} 237 mm^{2}	2048:124:64:32; 32 CU	2068; 2479	307.3	158.6	19,673	9,837	614.8	32 MB	8	256	GDDR6; 128-bit	16000	120 W	PCIe 4.0 ×8	2× HDMI 2.1
Radeon Pro W6800X (Navi 21)	Aug 3, 2021	RDNA 2 TSMC N7	26.8×10^{9} 520 mm^{2}	3840:240:96:60; 60 CU	1800; 2087	432.0; 500.8	172.8; 200.3	27,648; 32,056	13,824; 16,028	864.0; 1,002	128 MB	32	512	GDDR6; 256-bit	16000	300 W	PCIe 4.0 ×16	4× Thunderbolt 3; 1× HDMI 2.1
Radeon Pro W6800X Duo (Navi 21)	Aug 3, 2021	RDNA 2 TSMC N7	2× / 26.8×10^{9} 520 mm^{2}	2× / 3840:240:96:60; 60 CU	1800; 1979	2× / 432.0; 474.9	2× / 172.8; 189.9	2× / 27,648; 30,397	2× / 13,824; 15,199	2× / 864.0; 949.9	128 MB	2× 32	2× 512	GDDR6; 2× 256-bit	16000	400 W	PCIe 4.0 ×16	4× Thunderbolt 3; 1× HDMI 2.1
Radeon Pro W6900X (Navi 21)	Aug 3, 2021	RDNA 2 TSMC N7	26.8×10^{9} 520 mm^{2}	5120:320:128:80; 80 CU	1825; 2171	584.0; 694.7	233.6; 277.8	37,376; 44,462	18,688; 22,231	1,168; 1,389	128 MB	32	512	GDDR6; 256-bit	16000	300 W	PCIe 4.0 ×16	4× Thunderbolt 3; 1× HDMI 2.1

==== Mobile Workstation ====
Model (Code name)	Release date	Architecture & fab	Transistors & die size	Core		Fillrate (Note: Boost values (if available) are stated below the base value in italic.) (Note: Texture fillrate is calculated as the number of Texture Mapping Units multiplied by the base (or boost) core clock speed.) (Note: Pixel fillrate is calculated as the number of Render Output Units multiplied by the base (or boost) core clock speed.)		Processing power (Note: Precision performance is calculated from the base (or boost) core clock speed based on a FMA operation.) (GFLOPS)			Infinity Cache	Memory				TDP	Bus interface
Model (Code name)	Release date	Architecture & fab	Transistors & die size	Config (Note: Unified shaders : Texture mapping units : Render output units : Ray accelerators and Compute units (CU))	Clock (MHz)	Texture (GT/s)	Pixel (GP/s)	Half	Single	Double	Infinity Cache	Size (GB)	Bandwidth (GB/s)	Bus type & width	Clock (MT/s)	TDP	Bus interface
Radeon Pro W6300M (Navi 24)	Jan 19, 2022	RDNA 2 TSMC N6	5.4×10^{9} 107 mm^{2}	768:48:32:12; 12 CU	2214	106.3	70.8	6,801	3,401	212.5	8 MB	2	64	GDDR6; 32-bit	14000	25 W	PCIe 4.0 ×4
Radeon Pro W6500M (Navi 24)	Jan 19, 2022	RDNA 2 TSMC N6	5.4×10^{9} 107 mm^{2}	1024:64:32:16; 16 CU	2588	165.6	82.8	10,478	5,239	327.4	16 MB	4	128	GDDR6; 64-bit	14000	35–50 W	PCIe 4.0 ×4
Radeon Pro W6600M (Navi 23)	Jun 8, 2021	RDNA 2 TSMC N7	11.06×10^{9} 237 mm^{2}	1792:112:64:28; 28 CU	2200; 2900	246.4; 324.8	140.8; 185.6	15,770; 20,787	7,885; 10,394	492.8; 649.6	32 MB	8	224	GDDR6; 128-bit	14000	65–90 W	PCIe 4.0 ×16

=== Integrated graphics processing units (iGPUs) ===
Model	Launch	Codename	Architecture & fab	Die size (Note: Full die, not just the iGP)	Core		Fillrate (Note: Boost values (if available) are stated below the base value in italic.) (Note: Texture fillrate is calculated as the number of Texture Mapping Units multiplied by the base (or boost) core clock speed.) (Note: Pixel fillrate is calculated as the number of Render Output Units multiplied by the base (or boost) core clock speed.)		Processing power (Note: Precision performance is calculated from the base (or boost) core clock speed based on a FMA operation.) (GFLOPS)			Cache			TDP	CPUs/APUs
Model	Launch	Codename	Architecture & fab	Die size	Config (Note: Unified shaders : Texture mapping units : Render output units : Ray accelerators and Compute units (CU))	Clock (MHz)	Texture (GT/s)	Pixel (GP/s)	Half	Single	Double	L0	L1	L2	TDP	CPUs/APUs
Radeon Graphics	Sep 27, 2022	Raphael / Granite Ridge	RDNA 2 TSMC N6	122 mm^{2}	2 CU; 128:8:4:2	400; 2200	3.2; 17.6	1.6; 8.8	204.8; 1126.4	102.4; 563.2	6.4; 35.2	32 KB	128 KB	2 MB	65–170 W	Ryzen 7000 & 9000 series
Radeon 610M	Feb 28, 2023	Dragon Range / Fire Range	RDNA 2 TSMC N6	122 mm^{2}	2 CU; 128:8:4:2	400; 2200	3.2; 17.6	1.6; 8.8	204.8; 1126.4	102.4; 563.2	6.4; 35.2	32 KB	128 KB	2 MB	45–75 W	Ryzen 704xHX & 905xHX series
Radeon 610M	Sep 20, 2022	Mendocino	RDNA 2 TSMC N6	100 mm^{2}	2 CU; 128:8:4:2	1500; 1900	12.0; 15.2	6.0; 7.6	768; 972.8	384; 486.4	24; 30.4	32 KB	128 KB	2 MB	15 W	Ryzen 7020 series
Radeon 660M	Jan 4, 2022	Rembrandt	RDNA 2 TSMC N6	208 mm^{2}	6 CU; 384:24:16:6	1500; 1900	36.0; 45.6	24.0; 30.4	2304; 2918.4	1152; 1459.2	72; 91.2	96 KB	384 KB	2 MB	28–54 W	Ryzen 6000 series Ryzen 7035 series
Radeon 680M	Jan 4, 2022	Rembrandt	RDNA 2 TSMC N6	208 mm^{2}	12 CU; 768:48:32:12	2000; 2200	96.0; 105.6	64.0; 70.4	6144; 6758.4	3072; 3379.2	192; 211.2	192 KB	768 KB	2 MB	15–54 W	Ryzen 6000 series Ryzen 7035 series

=== Consoles ===
Model	Launch	Codename	Architecture	Fab	Transistors (billion) (Note: Full die, not just the GPU)	Die size	Core		Fillrate (Note: Boost values (if available) are stated below the base value in italic.) (Note: Texture fillrate is calculated as the number of Texture Mapping Units multiplied by the base (or boost) core clock speed.) (Note: Pixel fillrate is calculated as the number of Render Output Units multiplied by the base (or boost) core clock speed.)		Processing power (Note: Precision performance is calculated from the base (or boost) core clock speed based on a FMA operation.) (TFLOPS)			Cache				Memory					TDP
Model	Launch	Codename	Architecture	Fab	Transistors (billion)	Die size	Config (Note: Unified shaders : Texture mapping units : Render output units : Ray accelerators and Compute units (CU))	Clock (MHz)	Texture (GT/s)	Pixel (GP/s)	Half	Single	Double	L0	L1	L2	L3	Type	Size	Bandwidth (GB/s)	Bus width	Memory Clock (Gb/s)	TDP
Steam Deck	Feb 25, 2022	Aerith	RDNA 2	TSMC N7	2.4	163 mm^{2}	8 CU; 512:32:16:8	1000; 1600	32.0; 51.2	16.0; 25.6	2; 3.2	1; 1.6	0.063; 0.1	128 KB	512 KB	1 MB	8 MB	LPDDR5	16 GB	88	128-bit	5.5	15 W
Steam Deck	Nov 16, 2023	Sephiroth	RDNA 2	TSMC N6	2.4	131 mm^{2}	8 CU; 512:32:16:8	1000; 1600	32.0; 51.2	16.0; 25.6	2; 3.2	1; 1.6	0.063; 0.1	128 KB	512 KB	1 MB	8 MB	LPDDR5	16 GB	102.4	128-bit	6.4	15 W
Xbox Series S	Nov 10, 2020	Project Lockhart	RDNA 2	TSMC N7	8.0	197 mm^{2}	20 CU; 1280:80:32:20	1565	125.2	50.08	8.013	4.006	0.25	320 KB	1.25 MB	2 MB	—N/a	GDDR6	8 GB	224	128-bit	14.0	100 W
Xbox Series X	Nov 10, 2020	Project Scarlett	RDNA 2	TSMC N7	15.3	360 mm^{2}	52 CU; 3328:208:64:52	1825	379.6	116.8	24.294	12.147	0.759	832 KB	3.25 MB	5 MB	—N/a	GDDR6	10 GB	560	320-bit	14.0	200 W
Xbox Series X	Oct 15, 2024	Project Scarlett	RDNA 2	TSMC N6	15.3	313 mm^{2}	52 CU; 3328:208:64:52	1825	379.6	116.8	24.294	12.147	0.759	832 KB	3.25 MB	5 MB	—N/a	GDDR6	10 GB	560	320-bit	14.0	200 W
PlayStation 5	Nov 12, 2020	Oberon	RDNA 2	TSMC N7	10.6	308 mm^{2}	36 CU; 2304:144:64:36	2233	321.552	142.912	20.579	10.29	0.643	576 KB	2.25 MB	4 MB	—N/a	GDDR6	16 GB	448	256-bit	14.0	180 W
PlayStation 5	Sep 28, 2022	Oberon Plus	RDNA 2	TSMC N6	10.6	264 mm^{2}	36 CU; 2304:144:64:36	2233	321.552	142.912	20.579	10.29	0.643	576 KB	2.25 MB	4 MB	—N/a	GDDR6	16 GB	448	256-bit	14.0	180 W

== See also ==
- Ampere - competing Nvidia microarchitecture released in a similar time-frame with the competing GeForce RTX 30 series
