= Radeon Pro =

Brand of AMD graphics cards intended for professional use

AMD Radeon Pro
- Design firm: Advanced Micro Devices
- Type: Professional workstations

Radeon Pro is AMD's brand of professional oriented GPUs. It replaced AMD's FirePro brand in 2016. Compared to the Radeon brand for mainstream consumer/gamer products, the Radeon Pro brand is intended for use in workstations and the running of computer-aided design (CAD), computer-generated imagery (CGI), digital content creation (DCC), high-performance computing/GPGPU applications, and the creation and running of virtual reality programs and games.

The Radeon Pro product line directly competes with Nvidia, i.e. their Quadro (since discontinued) line of professional workstation cards.

== Products ==
=== Radeon PRO series ===
==== Radeon Pro Duo (2016) ====
The first card to be released under the Radeon Pro name was the dual GPU Radeon Pro Duo in April 2016. The card features 2 liquid cooled R9 Nano cores & was marketed strongly for both the running and creation of virtual reality content with the slogan "For Gamers Who Create and Creators Who Game". The aesthetics and marketing of the Pro Duo follow that of the rest of the Fury products in the 300 series.

==== Radeon Pro Duo (2017) ====
In April 2017 AMD announced a new version of the Radeon Pro Duo for release the following month. The newer version of the Pro Duo utilizes dual GPUs from the Polaris architecture, using the same GPUs as in the WX7100. While this results in a smaller number of compute units and lower theoretical performance, it allows for the inclusion of 32 GB GDDR5 SDRAM and a lower board power.

==== Radeon Pro SSG (Fiji) ====
Using AMD Radeon's GCN 3 architecture, the Radeon Pro SSG was unveiled in July 2016. SSG stands for Solid State Graphics, and the card will couple AMD's Fiji core with solid-state storage to increase the frame buffer for rendering. This expansion of quick access storage will, therefore, relieve the issue of latency that occurs when a GPU has to retrieve information from a mass storage device via the CPU when a card's limited VRAM is maxed out in heavy workloads. Users will be able to add up to 1 TB of PCIe M.2 NAND flash memory to improve render and scrubbing times. AMD demonstrated a 5.3 fold increase in performance on 8K video scrubbing. This SSD storage space can be made available to the operating system or controlled entirely by the GPU. The Fiji-based Radeon Pro SSG card was available as a beta program.

==== Radeon Pro SSG (Vega) ====
In July 2017, AMD released the Vega-based Radeon Pro SSG. The card utilizes 16 GB of second generation ECC high bandwidth memory (HBM2), an upgrade from the Fiji-based card's 4 GB of first generation HBM memory. The Vega card also increased the built in solid-state storage to 2 TB.

==== Radeon Vega Frontier Edition ====
AMD announced in May 2017 the Radeon Vega Frontier Edition, for release in June of that year. While not branded as a Pro product, the card is marketed within the Radeon Pro series. The Radeon Vega Frontier Edition uses the new "Next-Gen Compute Unit" and 16 GB of HBM2 memory for an expected 13.1 TFLOPs of single precision and 26.2 TFLOPs of half precision performance. Ultimately, two Frontier Edition products were released with either air or liquid cooling. The liquid cooling part supported a higher TDP, and was able to reach and sustain higher clock speeds, but otherwise the two products have similar hardware specifications.

=== Radeon Pro V series ===
The Pro V series was announced in August 2018 with the Vega-based Radeon Pro V340, a dual-GPU flagship card for use in datacenter virtualization, supporting up to 32 virtual machines at a time, as well as several other potential uses for Computer-aided design, general rendering tasks, and Desktop as a Service. It was expected to be available in Q4 of that year.

=== Radeon Pro WX series ===
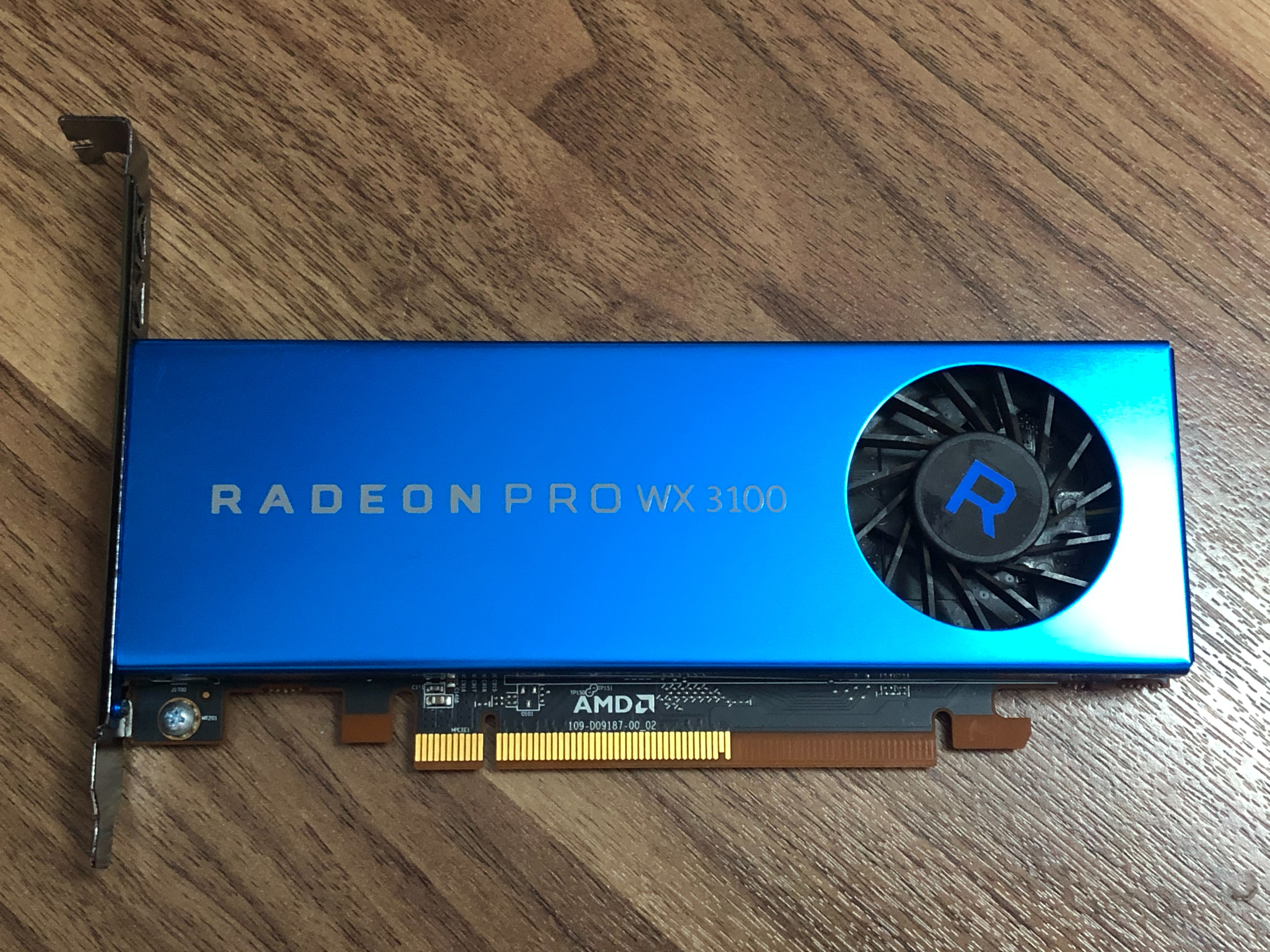
AMD Radeon Pro WX 3100

Radeon Pro WX series are graphics cards designed specifically for professional applications used in engineering, design, content creation, and science. The first Radeon Pro cards with the WX prefix to be announced were the WX 7100, the WX 5100 and the WX 4100 in July 2016. These Polaris based cards are once again aimed at the traditional professional market and are set to replace the FirePro Wx100 series and FirePro Wx300 series. These cards, along with the Pro SSG, used the new, non-toxic and energy efficient YInMn Blue, discovered by Mas Subramanian. This unique aesthetic for the Radeon Pro line distinguished the professional products from the consumer Radeon series.

The smallest card, the half-height WX 4100, was marketed for use in small form factor workstations. Designed for real-time content engines and CAD and CAM manufacturing, the WX 5100 fits in between the WX 4100 and the WX 7100 in terms of performance, with the latter once again marketed with emphasis on the application of VR and other media creation, while claiming to be "The Most Affordable Workstation Solution".

In June 2017, AMD announced the addition of the lower power WX 2100 and WX 3100 cards to the Radeon Pro WX series. Both cards are based on the Polaris GPU and are rated at 1.25 TFLOPS. The WX 2100 has 2 GB of GDDR5 SDRAM, while the WX 3100 has 4 GB of GDDR5 memory.

In September 2017, AMD launched the WX 9100 based on the Vega architecture. The card features 16 GB of ECC HBM2 memory and is rated at 12.29 TFLOPS. As the new flagship of the WX line, it greatly exceeds the performance of the older WX 7100 which is rated at 5.73 TFLOPS. The WX 9100 has ISV (Independent Software Vendor) certified drivers for professional applications including Siemens NX, PTC Creo, Dassault Systèmes CATIA and 3DExperience Platform, Dassault Systèmes SOLIDWORKS, and Autodesk® Revit®. The WX 9100 is particularly well-suited for mission critical workloads and complex scientific modeling because the ECC memory helps correct "single or double bit error as a result of naturally occurring background radiation."

=== Radeon Pro 400 series ===
Mobile Radeon Pro parts were first revealed with the release of the 2016 update to the Apple 15" MacBook Pro. These appear to be Polaris 11 derived parts with 10-16 4th generation GCN compute units, providing between 1 and 1.86 TFLOPS of performance.

=== Radeon Pro 500 series ===
Released in conjunction with the 2017 Apple iMac refresh, the Radeon Pro 500 series serve as GPUs for the 4K and 5K Retina display iMacs. The 500 series ranges supports 2 to 8 GB of graphics RAM with performance from 1.3 to 5.5 TFLOPS.

=== Radeon Pro Vega series ===
The Radeon Pro Vega product line of GPUs were first announced in 2017 as a part of Apple's iMac Pro. The two models, Radeon Pro Vega 56 and 64, support 8 and 16 GB of HBM2 memory, respectively. On October 30, 2018, Apple added graphics upgrade options for their 15-inch MacBook Pro lineup consisting Radeon Pro Vega 16 and 20. Derived from Vega 12 GPU that was only used on Apple laptops, both GPU features a 4 GB HBM2 memory stack and performance up to 3.3 TFLOPS.

The second-generation, 7 nm Radeon Pro Vega II was announced in 2019 as part of Apple's third-generation Mac Pro desktop computer. The Pro Vega II supports 32 GB of HBM2 memory, while the Pro Vega II Duo combines two Vega GPUs and supports 64 GB of HBM2 memory. The Mac Pro supports up to two Pro Vega II or Pro Vega II Duo graphics cards, allowing up to four Vega GPUs and 128 GB of HBM2 memory to be used in a system.

==== Radeon Pro VII series ====
The Radeon Pro VII was announced in May 2020, as a professional variant of the Radeon VII.

=== Radeon Pro 5000/5000M series ===
Released in conjunction with the 2019 Apple 16-inch MacBook Pro. Two models were announced, the 5300M and the 5500M. Both feature GDDR6 memory interfaces, with 192 GB/s bandwidth. The 5500M supports up to 8 GB of GDDR6 and 4.0 TFLOPS. In June 2020, a new 5600M GPU model with 8 GB of HBM2 memory was quietly released.

=== Radeon Pro W5000/W5000M series ===
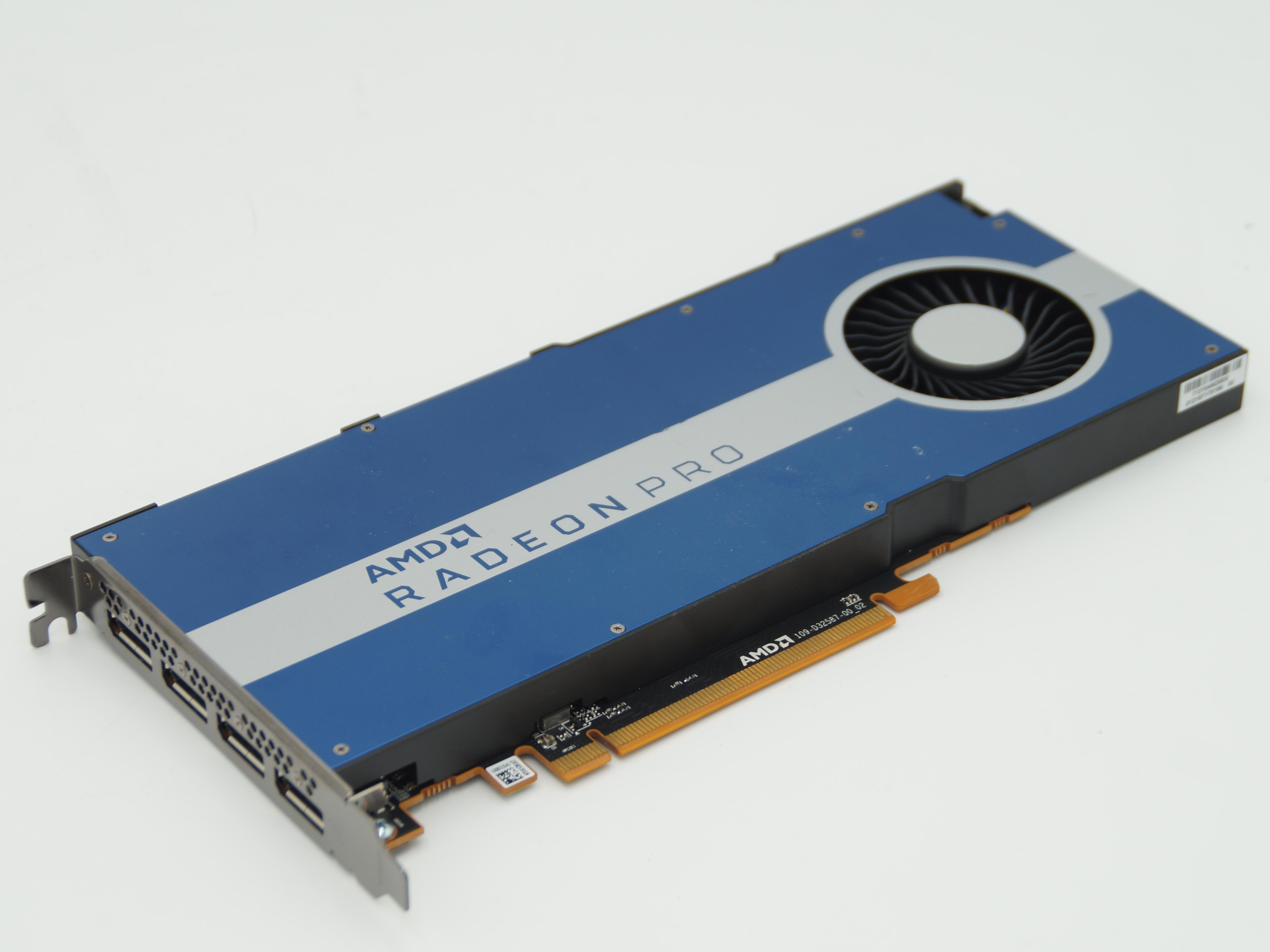
AMD Radeon Pro W5500

The Radeon Pro W5700, which is based on RDNA Architecture for desktop workstations, was officially released on November 19, 2019. The smaller model Radeon Pro W5500 was released in February 2020.

==== Radeon Pro W5000X series ====
The RDNA Radeon Pro W5000X series cards were designed for the 2019 Mac Pro as MPX cards, which interface through PCIe and a second proprietary Apple connector. These cards are the W5700X and W5500X.

=== Radeon Pro W6000/W6000M series ===
The first RDNA2 based W6000 series cards were officially announced on June 8, 2021 and launched in Q3 2021, with the AMD Radeon Pro W6800, W6600 and W6600M for mobile. On January 19, 2022, the W6400 was also released.

==== Radeon Pro W6000X series ====
The RDNA2 Radeon Pro W6000X series cards were designed for the 2019 Mac Pro as MPX cards. These cards are the W6900X, W6800X, and W6600X.

=== Radeon Pro W7000 series ===
The first RDNA 3-based W7000 series cards were officially announced on April 13, 2023, with the AMD Radeon Pro W7900 and W7800. On August 3 of the same year, the W7600 and W7500 were announced. On November 13, the W7700 was announced.

== Software ==
Most professional compute is done with the help of the Radeon Open Compute and the GPUOpen platforms.

=== Project Loom ===
At an AMD event in 2016 Project Loom was announced as a collaboration between AMD and Radiant Images. The real-time GPU accelerated photo and video stitching program will complement AMD's virtual reality development platform. While traditional photo stitching is not that much of a complex task, Project Loom aims to improve render times when tasked with the heavy workload of stitching together multiple high resolution angles to form a 360 degree VR experience, either to headsets or mobile devices. Using AMD's Direct GMA protocol, the software allows Radeon Pro graphics cards to work directly with video capture hardware to stitch together a 30 fps, 360 degree 4k resolution video from 24, 1080p cameras at 60 fps.

The software is to be competitive with Nvidia's VRWorks 360 Video SDK, and is reportedly set to be made open-source through GPUOpen.

=== ProRender ===
The successor to FireRender, Radeon ProRender works with high-end graphics programs as an OpenCL photorealistic offline 3D renderer and raytracing engine. ProRender aims to compete with programs such as NVIDIA's Iray and other expensive, proprietary solutions. However, AMD is making ProRender free and available for all graphics hardware. ProRender was released by AMD in June 2016 with support for Blender, 3D Studio Max, SolidWorks, and Maya.

=== Driver ===
API OpenGL 4.5 is supported and 4.6 is in development. API Vulkan 1.0 is supported for all with GCN Architecture. Vulkan 1.1 (GCN 2nd Gen. and higher) will be supported with actual drivers in 2018.

As with other GPU architectures, the floating-point performance is dependent on the precision and the GCN generation:

- In 4th Gen GCN, FP64 is 1/16 of FP32. Newer gaming cards have better ratios, which should be reflected on newer derivative "Pro" versions:
  - The gaming card Radeon R9 295X2 has it bumped up to 1/8 FP32.
  - The gaming card Radeon VII has it bumped up to 1/4 FP32.
  - The Radeon Pro Vega 20 has the ratio bumped up to 1/2 FP32.
- In 5th Gen GCN, FP16 is double of FP32. In 1st Gen to 4th it was equal to FP32.

For those requiring higher FP64 performance, a form of FP64 distinct from the IEEE double-precision can be emulated with the much faster FP32 operations. The cost is around a ~1/3 performance compared to FP32, much better than what the native support could provide.

== Chipset table ==
=== Workstation ===
==== Radeon PRO series ====
Model (Code name)	Release date & price	Architecture & fab	Transistors & die size	Core		Fillrate (Note: Boost values (if available) are stated below the base value in italic.) (Note: Texture fillrate is calculated as the number of Texture Mapping Units multiplied by the base (or boost) core clock speed.) (Note: Pixel fillrate is calculated as the number of Render Output Units multiplied by the base (or boost) core clock speed.)		Processing power (Note: Precision performance is calculated from the base (or boost) core clock speed based on a FMA operation.) (GFLOPS)			Memory				TBP	Bus interface	Graphic output ports
Model (Code name)	Release date & price	Architecture & fab	Transistors & die size	Config (Note: Unified shaders : Texture mapping units : Render output units and Compute units (CU))	Clock (MHz)	Texture (GT/s)	Pixel (GP/s)	Half	Single	Double	Size	Bandwidth (GB/s)	Bus type & width	Clock (MT/s)	TBP	Bus interface	Graphic output ports
Radeon Pro Duo (Fiji)	Apr 26, 2016 $1,499 USD	GCN 3 TSMC 28 nm	2× / 8.9×10^{9} 596 mm^{2}	2× / 4096:256:64; 64 CU	1000	2× 256.0	2× 64.00	2× 8,192	2× 8,192	2× 512.0	2× 4 GB	2× 512	HBM; 2× 4096-bit	1000	350 W	PCIe 3.0 ×16	3× DP 1.2; 1× HDMI 1.4a
Radeon Pro Duo (Polaris 10)	Apr 24, 2017 $999 USD	GCN 4 GloFo 14 nm	2× / 5.7×10^{9} 232 mm^{2}	2× / 2304:128:32; 36 CU	1243	2× 179.0	2× 39.78	2× 5,728	2× 5,728	2× 358.0	2× 16 GB	2× 224	GDDR5; 2× 256-bit	7000	250 W	PCIe 3.0 ×16	3× DP 1.4a 1× HDMI 2.0b
Radeon Pro SSG (Fiji)	Jul 26, 2016 prototype only $9,999 USD	GCN 3 TSMC 28 nm	8.9×10^{9} 596 mm^{2}	4096:256:64; 64 CU	1050	268.8	67.20	8,601	8,601	537.6	4 GB +1 TB SSD	512	HBM + SSG; 4096-bit	1000	200 W	PCIe 3.0 ×16	4× DP 1.2
Radeon Pro SSG (Vega 10)	Aug 8, 2017 $6,999 USD	GCN 5 GloFo 14 nm	12.5×10^{9} 495 mm^{2}	4096:256:64; 64 CU	1440; 1500	368.6; 384.0	92.16; 96.00	23,593; 24,576	11,796; 12,288	737.2; 768.0	16 GB +2 TB SSD	484	HBM2 + SSG; 2048-bit	1890	230 W	PCIe 3.0 ×16	6× miniDP 1.4a
Radeon Vega Frontier Edition (Vega 10)	Jun 27, 2017 $999 USD	GCN 5 GloFo 14 nm	12.5×10^{9} 495 mm^{2}	4096:256:64; 64 CU	1382; 1600	353.8; 409.6	88.4; 102.4	22,643; 26,214	11,321; 13,107	707.6; 819.2	16 GB	484	HBM2; 2048-bit	1890	300 W	PCIe 3.0 ×16	3× DP 1.4a 1× HDMI 2.0b
Radeon Vega Frontier Edition (Liquid-cooled) (Vega 10)	Jun 27, 2017 $1,499 USD	GCN 5 GloFo 14 nm	12.5×10^{9} 495 mm^{2}	4096:256:64; 64 CU	1382; 1600	353.8; 409.6	88.4; 102.4	22,643; 26,214	11,321; 13,107	707.6; 819.2	16 GB	484	HBM2; 2048-bit	1890	375 W	PCIe 3.0 ×16	3× DP 1.4a 1× HDMI 2.0b

==== Radeon Pro WX x100 series ====
Model (Code name)	Release date & price	Architecture & fab	Transistors & die size	Core		Fillrate (Note: Boost values (if available) are stated below the base value in italic.) (Note: Texture fillrate is calculated as the number of Texture Mapping Units multiplied by the base (or boost) core clock speed.) (Note: Pixel fillrate is calculated as the number of Render Output Units multiplied by the base (or boost) core clock speed.)		Processing power (Note: Precision performance is calculated from the base (or boost) core clock speed based on a FMA operation.) (GFLOPS)			Memory				TBP	Bus interface	Graphic output ports
Model (Code name)	Release date & price	Architecture & fab	Transistors & die size	Config (Note: Unified shaders : Texture mapping units : Render output units and Compute units (CU))	Clock (MHz)	Texture (GT/s)	Pixel (GP/s)	Half	Single	Double	Size (GB)	Bandwidth (GB/s)	Bus type & width	Clock (MT/s)	TBP	Bus interface	Graphic output ports
Radeon Pro WX 2100 (Polaris 12)	Jun 1, 2017 $149 USD	GCN 4 GloFo 14 nm	2.2×10^{9} 103 mm^{2}	512:32:16; 8 CU	925; 1219	29.6; 39.0	14.8; 19.5	947; 1,250	947; 1,250	59.2; 78	2	48	GDDR5; 64-bit	6000	35 W	PCIe 3.0 ×8	1× DP 1.4a 2× miniDP 1.4a
Radeon Pro WX 3100 (Polaris 12)	Jun 1, 2017 $199 USD	GCN 4 GloFo 14 nm	2.2×10^{9} 103 mm^{2}	512:32:16; 8 CU	925; 1219	29.6; 39.0	14.8; 19.5	947; 1,250	947; 1,250	59.2; 78	4	96	GDDR5; 128-bit	6000	50 W	PCIe 3.0 ×8	1× DP 1.4a 2× miniDP 1.4a
Radeon Pro WX 4100 (Polaris 11)	Nov 10, 2016 $399 USD	GCN 4 GloFo 14 nm	3.0×10^{9} 123 mm^{2}	1024:64:16; 16 CU	1125; 1201	72; 76.9	18; 19.2	2,304; 2,460	2,304; 2,460	144; 154	4	96	GDDR5; 128-bit	7000	50 W	PCIe 3.0 ×8	4× miniDP 1.4a
Radeon Pro WX 5100 (Polaris 10)	Nov 18, 2016 $499 USD	GCN 4 GloFo 14 nm	5.7×10^{9} 232 mm^{2}	1792:112:32; 28 CU	713; 1086	79.85; 121.6	22.8; 34.75	2,555; 3,892	2,555; 3,892	159.7; 243.3	8	160	GDDR5; 256-bit	5000	75 W	PCIe 3.0 ×16	4× DP 1.4a
Radeon Pro WX 7100 (Polaris 10)	Nov 10, 2016 $799 USD	GCN 4 GloFo 14 nm	5.7×10^{9} 232 mm^{2}	2304:144:32; 36 CU	1188; 1243	171; 179	38; 39.78	4,150; 5,728	5,474; 5,728	342.1; 358	8	224	GDDR5; 256-bit	7000	130 W	PCIe 3.0 ×16	4× DP 1.4a
Radeon Pro WX 9100 (Vega 10)	Sep 13, 2017 $2,199 USD	GCN 5 GloFo 14 nm	12.5×10^{9} 495mm^{2}	4096:256:64; 64 CU	1200; 1500	307.2; 384.0	76.8; 96.0	19,660; 24,576	9,830; 12,288	614.4; 768	16	484	HBM2; 2048-bit	1890	230 W	PCIe 3.0 ×16	6× miniDP 1.4a

==== Radeon Pro WX x200 series ====
Model (Code name)	Release date & price	Architecture & fab	Transistors & die size	Core		Fillrate (Note: Boost values (if available) are stated below the base value in italic.) (Note: Texture fillrate is calculated as the number of Texture Mapping Units multiplied by the base (or boost) core clock speed.) (Note: Pixel fillrate is calculated as the number of Render Output Units multiplied by the base (or boost) core clock speed.)		Processing power (Note: Precision performance is calculated from the base (or boost) core clock speed based on a FMA operation.) (GFLOPS)			Memory				TBP	Bus interface	Graphic output ports
Model (Code name)	Release date & price	Architecture & fab	Transistors & die size	Config (Note: Unified shaders : Texture mapping units : Render output units and Compute units (CU))	Clock (MHz)	Texture (GT/s)	Pixel (GP/s)	Half	Single	Double	Size (GB)	Bandwidth (GB/s)	Bus type & width	Clock (MT/s)	TBP	Bus interface	Graphic output ports
Radeon Pro WX 3200 (Polaris 23)	Jul 2, 2019 $199 USD	GCN 4 GloFo 14 nm	2.2×10^{9} 103mm^{2}	640:32:16; 10 CU	1295	41.44	20.72	1,658	1,658	103.6	4	96	GDDR5; 128-bit	6000	50 W	PCIe 3.0 ×8	4× mini-DP 1.4a
Radeon Pro WX 8200 (Vega 10)	Aug 13, 2018 $999 USD	GCN 5 GloFo 14 nm	12.5×10^{9} 495mm^{2}	3584:224:64; 56 CU	1200; 1500	268.8; 336.0	76.8; 96.00	17,203; 21,504	8,601; 10,752	537.6; 672.0	8	512	HBM2; 2048-bit	2000	230 W	PCIe 3.0 ×16	4× mini-DP 1.4a

==== Radeon Pro Vega (for Apple Mac Pro) ====
Model (Code name)	Release date & price	Architecture & fab	Transistors & die size	Core		Fillrate (Note: Boost values (if available) are stated below the base value in italic.) (Note: Texture fillrate is calculated as the number of Texture Mapping Units multiplied by the base (or boost) core clock speed.) (Note: Pixel fillrate is calculated as the number of Render Output Units multiplied by the base (or boost) core clock speed.)		Processing power (Note: Precision performance is calculated from the base (or boost) core clock speed based on a FMA operation.) (GFLOPS)			Memory				TBP	Bus interface	Graphic output ports
Model (Code name)	Release date & price	Architecture & fab	Transistors & die size	Config (Note: Unified shaders : Texture mapping units : Render output units and Compute units (CU))	Clock (MHz)	Texture (GT/s)	Pixel (GP/s)	Half	Single	Double	Size (GB)	Bandwidth (GB/s)	Bus type & width	Clock (MT/s)	TBP	Bus interface	Graphic output ports
Radeon Pro Vega II (Vega 20)	2019 $2,800 USD	GCN 5 TSMC 7 nm	13.23×10^{9} 331 mm^{2}	4096:256:64; 64 CU	1720	440.3	110.1	28,180	14,090	880	32	1024	HBM2; 4096-bit	2000	475 W	PCIe 3.0 ×16	4× Thunderbolt 3 (USB Type-C); 1× HDMI 2.0b
Radeon Pro Vega II Duo (Vega 20)	2019 $5,600 USD	GCN 5 TSMC 7 nm	13.23×10^{9} 331 mm^{2}	2× / 4096:256:64; 64 CU	1720	2× 440.3	2× 110.1	2× 28,180	2× 14,090	2× 880	2× 32	2× 1024	HBM2; 2× 4096-bit	2000	475 W	PCIe 3.0 ×16	4× Thunderbolt 3 (USB Type-C); 1× HDMI 2.0b

==== Radeon Pro VII ====
Model (Code name)	Release date & price	Architecture & fab	Transistors & die size	Core		Fillrate (Note: Boost values (if available) are stated below the base value in italic.) (Note: Texture fillrate is calculated as the number of Texture Mapping Units multiplied by the base (or boost) core clock speed.) (Note: Pixel fillrate is calculated as the number of Render Output Units multiplied by the base (or boost) core clock speed.)		Processing power (Note: Precision performance is calculated from the base (or boost) core clock speed based on a FMA operation.) (GFLOPS)			Memory				TBP	Bus interface	Graphic output ports
Model (Code name)	Release date & price	Architecture & fab	Transistors & die size	Config (Note: Unified shaders : Texture mapping units : Render output units and Compute units (CU))	Clock (MHz)	Texture (GT/s)	Pixel (GP/s)	Half	Single	Double	Size (GB)	Bandwidth (GB/s)	Bus type & width	Clock (MT/s)	TBP	Bus interface	Graphic output ports
Radeon Pro VII (Vega 20)	May 13, 2020 $1,899 USD	GCN 5 TSMC 7 nm	13.23×10^{9} 331 mm^{2}	3840:240:64; 60 CU	1400; 1700	336.0; 408.0	89.6; 108.8	21,504; 26,112	10,752; 13,056	5,376; 6,528	16	1024	HBM2; 4096-bit	2000	250 W	PCIe 4.0 ×16	6× miniDP 1.4a

==== Radeon Pro 5000 series (for Apple iMac) ====
Model (Code name)	Release date	Architecture & fab	Transistors & die size	Core		Fillrate (Note: Boost values (if available) are stated below the base value in italic.) (Note: Texture fillrate is calculated as the number of Texture Mapping Units multiplied by the base (or boost) core clock speed.) (Note: Pixel fillrate is calculated as the number of Render Output Units multiplied by the base (or boost) core clock speed.)		Processing power (Note: Precision performance is calculated from the base (or boost) core clock speed based on a FMA operation.) (GFLOPS)			Memory				TDP	Bus interface
Model (Code name)	Release date	Architecture & fab	Transistors & die size	Config (Note: Unified shaders : Texture mapping units : Render output units and Compute units (CU))	Clock (MHz)	Texture (GT/s)	Pixel (GP/s)	Half	Single	Double	Size (GB)	Bandwidth (GB/s)	Bus type & width	Clock (MT/s)	TDP	Bus interface
Radeon Pro 5300 (Navi 14)	Aug 4, 2020	RDNA; TSMC N7	6.4×10^{9} 158 mm^{2}	1280:80:32; 20 CU	1000; 1650	80; 132	32; 52.8	5,120; 8,448	2,560; 4,224	160; 264	4	224	GDDR6; 128-bit	14000	130 W	PCIe 4.0 ×8
Radeon Pro 5500 XT (Navi 14)	Aug 4, 2020	RDNA; TSMC N7	6.4×10^{9} 158 mm^{2}	1536:96:32; 24 CU	1187; 1757	114; 168.7	38; 56.2	7,292; 10,796	3,646; 5,398	227.9; 337.3	8	224	GDDR6; 128-bit	14000	130 W	PCIe 4.0 ×8
Radeon Pro 5700 (Navi 10)	Aug 4, 2020	RDNA; TSMC N7	10.3×10^{9} 251 mm^{2}	2304:144:64; 36 CU	1243; 1350	179; 194.4	79.6; 86.4	11,456; 12,442	5,728; 6,221	358; 388.8	8	384	GDDR6; 256-bit	12000	130 W	PCIe 4.0 ×16
Radeon Pro 5700 XT (Navi 10)	Aug 4, 2020	RDNA; TSMC N7	10.3×10^{9} 251 mm^{2}	2560:160:64; 40 CU	1243; 1499	198.9; 239.8	79.6; 95.94	12,728; 15,350	6,364; 7,675	397.8; 479.7	16	384	GDDR6; 256-bit	12000	130 W	PCIe 4.0 ×16

==== Radeon Pro W5000 series ====
Model (Code name)	Release date & price	Architecture & fab	Transistors & die size	Core		Fillrate (Note: Boost values (if available) are stated below the base value in italic.) (Note: Texture fillrate is calculated as the number of Texture Mapping Units multiplied by the base (or boost) core clock speed.) (Note: Pixel fillrate is calculated as the number of Render Output Units multiplied by the base (or boost) core clock speed.)		Processing power (Note: Precision performance is calculated from the base (or boost) core clock speed based on a FMA operation.) (GFLOPS)			Memory				TDP	Bus interface	Graphic output ports
Model (Code name)	Release date & price	Architecture & fab	Transistors & die size	Config (Note: Unified shaders : Texture mapping units : Render output units and Compute units (CU))	Clock (MHz)	Texture (GT/s)	Pixel (GP/s)	Half	Single	Double	Size (GB)	Bandwidth (GB/s)	Bus type & width	Clock (MT/s)	TDP	Bus interface	Graphic output ports
Radeon Pro W5500 (Navi 14)	Feb 10, 2020 $399 USD	RDNA; TSMC N7	6.4×10^{9} 158 mm^{2}	1408:88:32; 22 CU	1744; 1855	153.4; 163.2	55.8; 59.36	9,822; 10,450	4,911; 5,224	306.9; 326.5	8	224	GDDR6; 128-bit	14000	125 W	PCIe 4.0 ×8	4× DP 1.4a
Radeon Pro W5700 (Navi 10)	Nov 19, 2019 $799 USD	RDNA; TSMC N7	10.3×10^{9} 251 mm^{2}	2304:144:64; 36 CU	1400; 1880	201.6; 270.7	89.6; 120.3	12,902; 17,330	6,451; 8,663	403.2; 541.4	8	448	GDDR6; 256-bit	14000	205 W	PCIe 4.0 ×16	5× miniDP 1.4a 1× USB Type-C

==== Radeon Pro W5000X series (for Apple Mac Pro) ====
Model (Code name)	Release date	Architecture & fab	Transistors & die size	Core		Fillrate (Note: Boost values (if available) are stated below the base value in italic.) (Note: Texture fillrate is calculated as the number of Texture Mapping Units multiplied by the base (or boost) core clock speed.) (Note: Pixel fillrate is calculated as the number of Render Output Units multiplied by the base (or boost) core clock speed.)		Processing power (Note: Precision performance is calculated from the base (or boost) core clock speed based on a FMA operation.) (GFLOPS)			Memory				TDP	Bus interface	Graphic output ports
Model (Code name)	Release date	Architecture & fab	Transistors & die size	Config (Note: Unified shaders : Texture mapping units : Render output units and Compute units (CU))	Clock (MHz)	Texture (GT/s)	Pixel (GP/s)	Half	Single	Double	Size (GB)	Bandwidth (GB/s)	Bus type & width	Clock (MT/s)	TDP	Bus interface	Graphic output ports
Radeon Pro W5500X (Navi 14)	2020	RDNA; TSMC N7	6.4×10^{9} 158 mm^{2}	1536:96:32; 24 CU	1757	163.2	59.36	11,200	5,600	326.5	8	224	GDDR6; 128-bit	14000	130 W	PCIe 4.0 ×8	2× HDMI 2.0b
Radeon Pro W5700X (Navi 10)	Dec 11, 2019	RDNA; TSMC N7	10.3×10^{9} 251 mm^{2}	2560:160:64; 40 CU	1243; 1860	198.8; 297.6	79.5; 119.04	12,728; 19,046	6,364; 9,523	397.8; 595.2	16	448	GDDR6; 256-bit	14000	250 W	PCIe 4.0 ×16	4× Thunderbolt 3; 1× HDMI 2.0b

==== Radeon Pro W6000 series ====
Model (Code name)	Release date & price	Architecture & fab	Transistors & die size	Core		Fillrate (Note: Boost values (if available) are stated below the base value in italic.) (Note: Texture fillrate is calculated as the number of Texture Mapping Units multiplied by the base (or boost) core clock speed.) (Note: Pixel fillrate is calculated as the number of Render Output Units multiplied by the base (or boost) core clock speed.)		Processing power (Note: Precision performance is calculated from the base (or boost) core clock speed based on a FMA operation.) (GFLOPS)			Infinity Cache	Memory				TDP	Bus interface	Graphic output ports
Model (Code name)	Release date & price	Architecture & fab	Transistors & die size	Config (Note: Unified shaders : Texture mapping units : Render output units : Ray accelerators and Compute units (CU))	Clock (MHz)	Texture (GT/s)	Pixel (GP/s)	Half	Single	Double	Infinity Cache	Size (GB)	Bandwidth (GB/s)	Bus type & width	Clock (MT/s)	TDP	Bus interface	Graphic output ports
Radeon Pro W6300 (Navi 24)	Oct 2022; OEM	RDNA 2 TSMC N6	5.4×10^{9} 107 mm^{2}	768:48:32:12; 12 CU	1512; 2040	72.58; 97.92	48.38; 65.28	4,644; 6,267	2,322; 3,133	145.1; 195.8	8 MB	2	64	GDDR6; 32-bit	16000	25 W	PCIe 4.0 ×4	2× DP 1.4a
Radeon Pro W6400 (Navi 24)	Jan 19, 2022 $229 USD	RDNA 2 TSMC N6	5.4×10^{9} 107 mm^{2}	768:48:32:12; 12 CU	2039; 2331	97.87; 111.9	65.25; 74.59	6,264; 7,161	3,132; 3,580	195.7; 223.8	16 MB	4	128	GDDR6; 64-bit	16000	50 W	PCIe 4.0 ×4	2× DP 1.4a
Radeon Pro W6600 (Navi 23)	Jun 8, 2021 $649 USD	RDNA 2 TSMC N7	11.06×10^{9} 237 mm^{2}	1792:112:64:28; 28 CU	2331; 2903	261.1; 325.1	149.2; 185.8	16,709; 20,809	8,354; 10,404	522.1; 650.3	32 MB	8	224	GDDR6; 128-bit	14000	130 W	PCIe 4.0 ×8	4× DP 1.4a
Radeon Pro W6800 (Navi 21)	Jun 8, 2021 $2249 USD	RDNA 2 TSMC N7	26.8×10^{9} 520 mm^{2}	3840:240:96:60; 60 CU	2075; 2320	498.0; 556.8	199.2; 222.7	31,872; 35,635	15,936; 17,818	996.0; 1,114	128 MB	32	512	GDDR6; 256-bit	16000	250 W	PCIe 4.0 ×16	6× miniDP 1.4a

==== Radeon Pro W6000X series (for Apple Mac Pro) ====
Model (Code name)	Release date	Architecture & fab	Transistors & die size	Core		Fillrate (Note: Boost values (if available) are stated below the base value in italic.) (Note: Texture fillrate is calculated as the number of Texture Mapping Units multiplied by the base (or boost) core clock speed.) (Note: Pixel fillrate is calculated as the number of Render Output Units multiplied by the base (or boost) core clock speed.)		Processing power (Note: Precision performance is calculated from the base (or boost) core clock speed based on a FMA operation.) (GFLOPS)			Infinity Cache	Memory				TDP	Bus interface	Graphic output ports
Model (Code name)	Release date	Architecture & fab	Transistors & die size	Config (Note: Unified shaders : Texture mapping units : Render output units : Ray accelerators and Compute units (CU))	Clock (MHz)	Texture (GT/s)	Pixel (GP/s)	Half	Single	Double	Infinity Cache	Size (GB)	Bandwidth (GB/s)	Bus type & width	Clock (MT/s)	TDP	Bus interface	Graphic output ports
Radeon Pro W6600X (Navi 23)	Mar 8, 2022	RDNA 2 TSMC N7	11.06×10^{9} 237 mm^{2}	2048:124:64:32; 32 CU	2068; 2479	307.3	158.6	19,673	9,837	614.8	32 MB	8	256	GDDR6; 128-bit	16000	120 W	PCIe 4.0 ×8	2× HDMI 2.1
Radeon Pro W6800X (Navi 21)	Aug 3, 2021	RDNA 2 TSMC N7	26.8×10^{9} 520 mm^{2}	3840:240:96:60; 60 CU	1800; 2087	432.0; 500.8	172.8; 200.3	27,648; 32,056	13,824; 16,028	864.0; 1,002	128 MB	32	512	GDDR6; 256-bit	16000	300 W	PCIe 4.0 ×16	4× Thunderbolt 3; 1× HDMI 2.1
Radeon Pro W6800X Duo (Navi 21)	Aug 3, 2021	RDNA 2 TSMC N7	2× / 26.8×10^{9} 520 mm^{2}	2× / 3840:240:96:60; 60 CU	1800; 1979	2× / 432.0; 474.9	2× / 172.8; 189.9	2× / 27,648; 30,397	2× / 13,824; 15,199	2× / 864.0; 949.9	128 MB	2× 32	2× 512	GDDR6; 2× 256-bit	16000	400 W	PCIe 4.0 ×16	4× Thunderbolt 3; 1× HDMI 2.1
Radeon Pro W6900X (Navi 21)	Aug 3, 2021	RDNA 2 TSMC N7	26.8×10^{9} 520 mm^{2}	5120:320:128:80; 80 CU	1825; 2171	584.0; 694.7	233.6; 277.8	37,376; 44,462	18,688; 22,231	1,168; 1,389	128 MB	32	512	GDDR6; 256-bit	16000	300 W	PCIe 4.0 ×16	4× Thunderbolt 3; 1× HDMI 2.1

==== Radeon Pro W7000 series ====
Model (Code name)	Release date & price	Architecture & fab	Chiplets (active)	Transistors & die size (Note: Approximate die size of entire MCM package that consists of single GCD (Graphics Compute Die) and six MCDs (Memory Cache Die). Radeon Pro W7800 has only four active MCDs, inactive one is for structural support and heat dissipation.)	Core		Fillrate (Note: Boost values (if available) are stated below the base value in italic.) (Note: Texture fillrate is calculated as the number of Texture Mapping Units multiplied by the base (or boost) core clock speed.) (Note: Pixel fillrate is calculated as the number of Render Output Units multiplied by the base (or boost) core clock speed.)		Processing power (Note: Precision performance is calculated from the base (or boost) core clock speed based on a FMA operation.) (TFLOPS)			Infinity Cache	Memory				TDP	Bus interface
Model (Code name)	Release date & price	Architecture & fab	Chiplets (active)	Transistors & die size	Config (Note: Unified shaders : Texture mapping units : Render output units : Ray accelerators : AI accelerators and Compute units (CU)) (Note: GPUs based on RDNA 3 have dual-issue stream processors so that up to two shader instructions can be executed per clock cycle under certain parallelism conditions.)	Clock (MHz)	Texture (GT/s)	Pixel (GP/s)	Half	Single	Double	Infinity Cache	Size (GB)	Bandwidth (GB/s)	Bus type & width	Clock (MT/s)	TDP	Bus interface
Radeon Pro W7500 (Navi 33)	Aug 3, 2023 $429 USD	RDNA 3 TSMC N6	—N/a	13.3×10^{9} 204 mm^{2}	1792:112:64; 28:56:28 CU	1500; 1700	168.0; 190.4	96.0; 108.8	24.37	12.19	0.381	32 MB	8	288	GDDR6; 128-bit	18000	70 W	PCIe 4.0 ×8
Radeon Pro W7600 (Navi 33)	Aug 3, 2023 $599 USD	RDNA 3 TSMC N6	—N/a	13.3×10^{9} 204 mm^{2}	2048:128:64; 32:64:32 CU	1720; 2440	220.1; 312.3	110.0; 156.2	39.98	19.99	0.625	32 MB	8	288	GDDR6; 128-bit	18000	130 W	PCIe 4.0 ×8
Radeon Pro W7700 (Navi 32)	Nov 13, 2023 $999 USD	RDNA 3 TSMC N5 (GCD); TSMC N6 (MCD)	1 × GCD; 4 × MCD	28.1×10^{9} ~346 mm^{2}	3072:192:96; 48:96:48 CU	1900; 2600	364.8; 499.2	182.4; 249.2	56.54	28.3	0.884	64 MB	16	576	GDDR6; 256-bit	18000	190 W	PCIe 4.0 ×16
Radeon Pro W7800 (Navi 31)	Apr 13, 2023 $2499 USD	RDNA 3 TSMC N5 (GCD); TSMC N6 (MCD)	1 × GCD; 4 × MCD	57.7×10^{9} ~531 mm^{2}	4480:280:128; 70:128:70 CU	1855; 2499	519.4; 699.7	237.4; 319.8	90.50	45.25	1.414	64 MB	32	576	GDDR6; 256-bit	18000	260 W	PCIe 4.0 ×16
Radeon Pro W7800 48GB (Navi 31)	Dec 2024	RDNA 3 TSMC N5 (GCD); TSMC N6 (MCD)	1 × GCD; 6 × MCD	57.7×10^{9} ~531 mm^{2}	4480:280:128; 70:128:70 CU	1855; 2499	519.4; 699.7	237.4; 319.8	90.50	45.25	1.414	96 MB	48	864	GDDR6; 384-bit	18000	281 W	PCIe 4.0 ×16
Radeon Pro W7900 Dual Slot (Navi 31)	Jun 19, 2024 $3499 USD	RDNA 3 TSMC N5 (GCD); TSMC N6 (MCD)	1 × GCD; 6 × MCD	57.7×10^{9} ~531 mm^{2}	6144:384:192; 96:192:96 CU	1855; 2495	712.3; 958.0	356.1; 479.0	122.6	61.32	1.916	96 MB	48	864	GDDR6; 384-bit	18000	295 W	PCIe 4.0 ×16
Radeon Pro W7900 (Navi 31)	Apr 13, 2023 $3999 USD	RDNA 3 TSMC N5 (GCD); TSMC N6 (MCD)	1 × GCD; 6 × MCD	57.7×10^{9} ~531 mm^{2}	6144:384:192; 96:192:96 CU	1855; 2495	712.3; 958.0	356.1; 479.0	122.6	61.32	1.916	96 MB	48	864	GDDR6; 384-bit	18000	295 W	PCIe 4.0 ×16

==== Radeon AI Pro R9000 series ====
Model (Code name)	Release date	Architecture & fab	Transistors & die size	Core		Fillrate (Note: Boost values (if available) are stated below the base value in italic.) (Note: Texture fillrate is calculated as the number of Texture Mapping Units multiplied by the base (or boost) core clock speed.) (Note: Pixel fillrate is calculated as the number of Render Output Units multiplied by the base (or boost) core clock speed.)		Processing power						Infinity Cache	Memory				TBP	Bus interface
Model (Code name)	Release date	Architecture & fab	Transistors & die size	Core		Fillrate		(TFLOPS) (Note: Precision performance is calculated from the base (or boost) core clock speed based on a FMA operation.)			AI TOPS (Note: Officially declared performance is twice the one shown here due to the use of sparsity.)			Infinity Cache	Memory				TBP	Bus interface
Model (Code name)	Release date	Architecture & fab	Transistors & die size	Config (Note: Unified shaders : Texture mapping units : Render output units : Ray accelerators : AI accelerators and Compute units (CU))	Clock (MHz)	Texture (GT/s)	Pixel (GP/s)	Half	Single	Double	FP8	INT8	INT4	Infinity Cache	Size (GB)	Bandwidth (GB/s)	Bus type & width	Clock (MT/s)	TBP	Bus interface
Radeon AI Pro R9600D (Navi 48)	Dec 11, 2025	RDNA 4 TSMC N4P	53.9 billion 357 mm^{2}	3072:192:96; 48:96:48 CU	1080; 2020	387.8	193.92	49.6	24.8	0.388	199	199	397	64 MB	32	640	GDDR6; 256-bit	20000	150 W	PCIe 5.0 ×16
Radeon AI Pro R9600 (Navi 48)	2026	RDNA 4 TSMC N4P	53.9 billion 357 mm^{2}	3072:192:96; 48:96:48 CU	1080; 2020	387.8	193.92	49.6	24.8	0.388	199	199	397	64 MB	32	640	GDDR6; 256-bit	20000	150 W	PCIe 5.0 ×16
Radeon AI Pro R9700S (Navi 48)	Dec 11, 2025	RDNA 4 TSMC N4P	53.9 billion 357 mm^{2}	4096:256:128; 64:128:64 CU	1660; 2920	425; 747.5	212.5; 373.76	54.4; 95.68	27.2; 47.84	0.425; 0.747	217.7; 383	217.7; 383	435.5; 766	64 MB	32	640	GDDR6; 256-bit	20000	300 W	PCIe 5.0 ×16
Radeon AI Pro R9700 (Navi 48)	Jul 23, 2025	RDNA 4 TSMC N4P	53.9 billion 357 mm^{2}	4096:256:128; 64:128:64 CU	1660; 2920	425; 747.5	212.5; 373.76	54.4; 95.68	27.2; 47.84	0.425; 0.747	217.7; 383	217.7; 383	435.5; 766	64 MB	32	640	GDDR6; 256-bit	20000	300 W	PCIe 5.0 ×16

=== Mobile workstation ===
==== Radeon Pro WX x100 Mobile series ====
- Half Precision Power (FP16) is equal single precision power (FP32) in 4th GCN Generation (in 5th Gen: Half Precision (FP16) = 2x SP (FP32))

Model (Code name)	Release date	Architecture & fab	Transistors & die size	Core		Fillrate (Note: Boost values (if available) are stated below the base value in italic.) (Note: Texture fillrate is calculated as the number of Texture Mapping Units (TMUs) multiplied by the base (or boost) core clock speed.) (Note: Pixel fillrate is calculated as the number of Render Output Units (ROPs) multiplied by the base (or boost) core clock speed.)		Processing power (Note: Precision performance is calculated from the base (or boost) core clock speed based on a FMA operation.) (GFLOPS)		Memory				TDP	Bus interface
Model (Code name)	Release date	Architecture & fab	Transistors & die size	Config (Note: Unified shaders : Texture mapping units : Render output units and Compute units (CU))	Clock (MHz)	Texture (GT/s)	Pixel (GP/s)	Single	Double	Size (GB)	Bandwidth (GB/s)	Bus type & width	Clock (MT/s)	TDP	Bus interface
Radeon Pro WX 2100 (Mobile) (Polaris 12)	Mar 1, 2017	GCN 4 Samsung/GloFo; 14LPP	2.2×10^{9} 103 mm^{2}	512:32:16; 8 CU	925; 1219	29.60; 39.01	14.80; 19.50	947.2; 1,250	59.20; 78.02	2	48	GDDR5; 64-bit	6000	35 W	PCIe 3.0 ×16
Radeon Pro WX 3100 (Mobile) (Polaris 12)	Mar 1, 2017	GCN 4 Samsung/GloFo; 14LPP	2.2×10^{9} 103 mm^{2}	512:32:16; 8 CU	925; 1219	29.60; 39.01	14.80; 19.50	947.2; 1,250	59.20; 78.02	4	96	GDDR5; 128-bit	6000	50 W	PCIe 3.0 ×16
Radeon Pro WX 4130 (Mobile) (Polaris 11)	Mar 1, 2017	GCN 4 Samsung/GloFo; 14LPP	3.0×10^{9} 123 mm^{2}	640:40:16; 10 CU	1002; 1053	40.08; 42.12	16.03; 16.85	1,282; 1,348	80.16; 84.24	4	96	GDDR5; 128-bit	6000	50 W	PCIe 3.0 ×16
Radeon Pro WX 4150 (Mobile) (Polaris 11)	Mar 1, 2017	GCN 4 Samsung/GloFo; 14LPP	3.0×10^{9} 123 mm^{2}	896:56:16; 14 CU	1002; 1053	56.11; 58.97	16.03; 16.85	1,796; 1,887	112.2; 117.9	4	96	GDDR5; 128-bit	6000	45-50 W	PCIe 3.0 ×16
Radeon Pro WX 4170 (Mobile) (Polaris 11)	Mar 1, 2017	GCN 4 Samsung/GloFo; 14LPP	3.0×10^{9} 123 mm^{2}	1024:64:16; 16 CU	1002; 1201	64.12; 76.86	16.03; 19.22	2,052; 2,460	128.3; 153.7	4	112	GDDR5; 128-bit	6000	50-60 W	PCIe 3.0 ×16
Radeon Pro WX 7100 (Mobile) (Polaris 10)	Mar 1, 2017	GCN 4 Samsung/GloFo; 14LPP	5.7×10^{9} 232 mm^{2}	2304:144:32; 36 CU	1188; 1243	171.1; 179.0	38.0; 39.78	5,474; 5,728	342.1; 358.0	8	160	GDDR5; 256-bit	5000	100-130 W	PCIe 3.0 ×16
Radeon Pro WX 7130 (Mobile) (Polaris 10)	Mar 1, 2017	GCN 4 Samsung/GloFo; 14LPP	5.7×10^{9} 232 mm^{2}	2304:144:32; 36 CU	1188; 1243	171.1; 179.0	38.0; 39.78	5,474; 5,728	342.1; 358.0	8	160	GDDR5; 256-bit	5000	100-130 W	PCIe 3.0 ×16

==== Radeon Pro 400 series (for Apple MacBook Pro) ====
Model (Code name)	Release date	Architecture & fab	Transistors & die size	Core		Fillrate (Note: Boost values (if available) are stated below the base value in italic.) (Note: Texture fillrate is calculated as the number of Texture Mapping Units multiplied by the base (or boost) core clock speed.) (Note: Pixel fillrate is calculated as the number of Render Output Units multiplied by the base (or boost) core clock speed.)		Processing power (Note: Precision performance is calculated from the base (or boost) core clock speed based on a FMA operation.) (GFLOPS)			Memory				TDP	Bus interface
Model (Code name)	Release date	Architecture & fab	Transistors & die size	Config (Note: Unified shaders : Texture mapping units : Render output units and Compute units (CU))	Clock (MHz)	Texture (GT/s)	Pixel (GP/s)	Half	Single	Double	Size (GB)	Bandwidth (GB/s)	Bus type & width	Clock (MT/s)	TDP	Bus interface
Radeon Pro 450 (Polaris 11)	Oct 30, 2016	GCN 4 GloFo 14 nm	3.0×10^{9} 123 mm^{2}	640:40:16; 10 CU	800	32.00	12.80	1,024	1,024	64.00	2	80	GDDR5; 128-bit	5000	35 W	PCIe 3.0 ×8
Radeon Pro 455 (Polaris 11)	Oct 30, 2016	GCN 4 GloFo 14 nm	3.0×10^{9} 123 mm^{2}	768:48:16; 12 CU	855	41.04	13.68	1,313	1,313	82.08	2	80	GDDR5; 128-bit	5000	35 W	PCIe 3.0 ×8
Radeon Pro 460 (Polaris 11)	Oct 30, 2016	GCN 4 GloFo 14 nm	3.0×10^{9} 123 mm^{2}	1024:64:16; 16 CU	850; 907	54.40; 58.05	13.60; 14.51	1,741; 1,858	1,741; 1,858	108.8; 116.1	4	80	GDDR5; 128-bit	5000	35 W	PCIe 3.0 ×8

==== Radeon Pro 500 series (for Apple iMac & MacBook Pro) ====
Model (Code name)	Release date	Architecture & fab	Transistors & die size	Core		Fillrate (Note: Boost values (if available) are stated below the base value in italic.) (Note: Texture fillrate is calculated as the number of Texture Mapping Units multiplied by the base (or boost) core clock speed.) (Note: Pixel fillrate is calculated as the number of Render Output Units multiplied by the base (or boost) core clock speed.)		Processing power (Note: Precision performance is calculated from the base (or boost) core clock speed based on a FMA operation.) (GFLOPS)			Memory				TDP	Bus interface
Model (Code name)	Release date	Architecture & fab	Transistors & die size	Config (Note: Unified shaders : Texture mapping units : Render output units and Compute units (CU))	Clock (MHz)	Texture (GT/s)	Pixel (GP/s)	Half	Single	Double	Size (GB)	Bandwidth (GB/s)	Bus type & width	Clock (MT/s)	TDP	Bus interface
Radeon Pro 555 (Polaris 21)	Jun 6, 2017	GCN 4 GloFo 14 nm	3.0×10^{9} 123 mm^{2}	768:48:16; 12 CU	850	40.80	13.60	1,306	1,306	81.60	2	81.60	GDDR5; 128-bit	5100	50 W	PCIe 3.0 ×16
Radeon Pro 555X (Polaris 21)	Jul 16, 2018	GCN 4 GloFo 14 nm	3.0×10^{9} 123 mm^{2}	768:48:16; 12 CU	907	43.54	14.51	1,393	1,393	87.07	4	94.08	GDDR5; 128-bit	5900	50 W	PCIe 3.0 ×16
Radeon Pro 560 (Polaris 21)	Jun 6, 2017	GCN 4 GloFo 14 nm	3.0×10^{9} 123 mm^{2}	1024:64:16; 16 CU	907	58.05	14.51	1,858	1,858	116.1	4	81.28	GDDR5; 128-bit	5100	50 W	PCIe 3.0 ×16
Radeon Pro 560X (Polaris 21)	Jul 16, 2018	GCN 4 GloFo 14 nm	3.0×10^{9} 123 mm^{2}	1024:64:16; 16 CU	1004	64.26	16.06	2,056	2,056	128.5	4	94.08	GDDR5; 128-bit	5900	75 W	PCIe 3.0 ×16
Radeon Pro 570 (Polaris 20)	Jun 6, 2017	GCN 4 GloFo 14 nm	5.7×10^{9} 232 mm^{2}	1792:112:32; 28 CU	1000; 1105	112.0; 123.8	32.00; 35.36	3,584; 3,960	3,584; 3,960	224.0; 247.5	4	217.0	GDDR5; 256-bit	6800	120 W	PCIe 3.0 ×16
Radeon Pro 570X (Polaris 20)	Mar 18, 2019	GCN 4 GloFo 14 nm	5.7×10^{9} 232 mm^{2}	1792:112:32; 28 CU	1000; 1105	112.0; 123.8	32.00; 35.36	3,584; 3,960	3,584; 3,960	224.0; 247.5	4	217.6	GDDR5; 256-bit	6800	150 W	PCIe 3.0 ×16
Radeon Pro 575 (Polaris 20)	Jun 6, 2017	GCN 4 GloFo 14 nm	5.7×10^{9} 232 mm^{2}	2048:128:32; 32 CU	1096	140.3	35.07	4,489	4,489	280.6	4	217.0	GDDR5; 256-bit	6800	120 W	PCIe 3.0 ×16
Radeon Pro 575X (Polaris 20)	Mar 18, 2019	GCN 4 GloFo 14 nm	5.7×10^{9} 232 mm^{2}	2048:128:32; 32 CU	1096	140.3	35.07	4,489	4,489	280.6	4	217.6	GDDR5; 256-bit	6800	150 W	PCIe 3.0 ×16
Radeon Pro 580 (Polaris 10)	Jun 6, 2017	GCN 4 GloFo 14 nm	5.7×10^{9} 232 mm^{2}	2304:144:32; 36 CU	1100; 1200	158.4; 172.8	35.2; 38.4	5,069; 5,530	5,069; 5,530	316.8; 345.6	8	217.0	GDDR5; 256-bit	6800	150 W	PCIe 3.0 ×16
Radeon Pro 580X (Polaris 10)	Mar 18, 2019	GCN 4 GloFo 14 nm	5.7×10^{9} 232 mm^{2}	2304:144:32; 36 CU	1100; 1200	158.4; 172.8	35.2; 38.4	5,069; 5,530	5,069; 5,530	316.8; 345.6	8	218.9	GDDR5; 256-bit	6800	185 W	PCIe 3.0 ×16

==== Radeon Pro WX x200 Mobile series ====
Model (Code name)	Release date	Architecture & fab	Transistors & die size	Core		Fillrate (Note: Boost values (if available) are stated below the base value in italic.) (Note: Texture fillrate is calculated as the number of Texture Mapping Units multiplied by the base (or boost) core clock speed.) (Note: Pixel fillrate is calculated as the number of Render Output Units multiplied by the base (or boost) core clock speed.)		Processing power (Note: Precision performance is calculated from the base (or boost) core clock speed based on a FMA operation.) (GFLOPS)			Memory				TDP	Bus interface
Model (Code name)	Release date	Architecture & fab	Transistors & die size	Config (Note: Unified shaders : Texture mapping units : Render output units and Compute units (CU))	Clock (MHz)	Texture (GT/s)	Pixel (GP/s)	Half	Single	Double	Size (GB)	Bandwidth (GB/s)	Bus type & width	Clock (MT/s)	TDP	Bus interface
Radeon Pro WX 3200 (Mobile) (Polaris 23)	Mar 1, 2017	GCN 4 GloFo 14 nm	2.2×10^{9} 103 mm^{2}	640:32:16; 10 CU	1082; 1295	34.62; 41.44	17.31; 20.72	1,385; 1,658	1,385; 1,658	86.56; 103.6	4	64	GDDR5; 128-bit	4000	65 W	PCIe 3.0 ×8

==== Radeon Pro Vega series (for Apple iMac & MacBook Pro) ====
Model (Code name)	Release date	Architecture & fab	Transistors & die size	Core		Fillrate (Note: Boost values (if available) are stated below the base value in italic.) (Note: Texture fillrate is calculated as the number of Texture Mapping Units multiplied by the base (or boost) core clock speed.) (Note: Pixel fillrate is calculated as the number of Render Output Units multiplied by the base (or boost) core clock speed.)		Processing power (Note: Precision performance is calculated from the base (or boost) core clock speed based on a FMA operation.) (GFLOPS)			Memory				TDP	Bus interface
Model (Code name)	Release date	Architecture & fab	Transistors & die size	Config (Note: Unified shaders : Texture mapping units : Render output units and Compute units (CU))	Clock (MHz)	Texture (GT/s)	Pixel (GP/s)	Half	Single	Double	Size (GB)	Bandwidth (GB/s)	Bus type & width	Clock (MT/s)	TDP	Bus interface
Radeon Pro Vega 16 (Vega 12)	Nov 14, 2018	GCN 5 GloFo 14 nm	?	1024:64:32; 16 CU	815; 1190	52.16; 76.16	26.08; 38.08	3,338; 4,874	1,669; 2,437	104.3; 152.3	4	307.2	HBM2; 1024-bit	2400	50 W	PCIe 3.0 ×16
Radeon Pro Vega 20 (Vega 12)	Nov 14, 2018	GCN 5 GloFo 14 nm	?	1280:80:32; 20 CU	815; 1283	65.20; 102.6	26.08; 41.06	4,173; 6,569	2,086; 3,285	130.4; 205.3	4	189.4	HBM2; 1024-bit	1480	50 W	PCIe 3.0 ×16
Radeon Pro Vega 48 (Vega 10)	Mar 19, 2019	GCN 5 GloFo 14 nm	12.5×10^{9} 495 mm^{2}	3072:192:64; 48 CU	1200	230.4	76.80	14,746	7,373	460.8	8	402.4	HBM2; 2048-bit	1572	?	PCIe 3.0 ×16
Radeon Pro Vega 56 (Vega 10)	Aug 17, 2017	GCN 5 GloFo 14 nm	12.5×10^{9} 495 mm^{2}	3584:224:64; 56 CU	1138; 1250	254.9; 280.0	72.83; 80.00	16,314; 17,920	8,157; 8,960	509.8; 560.0	8	402.4	HBM2; 2048-bit	1572	120 W	PCIe 3.0 ×16
Radeon Pro Vega 64 (Vega 10)	Jun 17, 2017	GCN 5 GloFo 14 nm	12.5×10^{9} 495 mm^{2}	4096:256:64; 64 CU	1250; 1350	320.0; 345.6	80.00; 86.40	20,480; 22,118	10,240; 11,059	640.0; 691.2	16	402.4	HBM2; 2048-bit	1572	?	PCIe 3.0 ×16
Radeon Pro Vega 64X (Vega 10)	Mar 19, 2019	GCN 5 GloFo 14 nm	12.5×10^{9} 495 mm^{2}	4096:256:64; 64 CU	1250; 1468	320.0; 375.8	80.00; 93.95	20,480; 24,051	10,240; 12,026	640.0; 751.6	16	512.0	HBM2; 2048-bit	2000	?	PCIe 3.0 ×16

==== Radeon Pro 5000M series (for Apple MacBook Pro) ====
Model (Code name)	Release date	Architecture & fab	Transistors die size	Core		Fillrate (Note: Boost values (if available) are stated below the base value in italic.) (Note: Texture fillrate is calculated as the number of Texture Mapping Units multiplied by the base (or boost) core clock speed.) (Note: Pixel fillrate is calculated as the number of Render Output Units multiplied by the base (or boost) core clock speed.)		Processing power (Note: Precision performance is calculated from the base (or boost) core clock speed based on a FMA operation.) (GFLOPS)			Memory				TDP	Bus interface
Model (Code name)	Release date	Architecture & fab	Transistors die size	Config (Note: Unified shaders : Texture mapping units : Render output units and Compute units (CU))	Clock (MHz)	Texture (GT/s)	Pixel (GP/s)	Half	Single	Double	Size (GB)	Bandwidth (GB/s)	Bus type & width	Clock (MT/s)	TDP	Bus interface
Radeon Pro 5300M (Navi 14)	Nov 13, 2019	RDNA; TSMC N7	6.4×10^{9} 158 mm^{2}	1280:80:32; 20 CU	1000; 1250	80.00; 100.0	32.00; 40.00	5,120; 6,400	2,560; 3,200	160.0; 200.0	4	192	GDDR6; 128-bit	12000	50 W	PCIe 4.0 ×8
Radeon Pro 5500M (Navi 14)	Nov 13, 2019	RDNA; TSMC N7	6.4×10^{9} 158 mm^{2}	1536:96:32; 24 CU	1000; 1300	96.00; 124.8	32.00; 41.60	6,144; 8,908	3,072; 4,454	192.0; 278.4	4; 8	192	GDDR6; 128-bit	12000	50 W	PCIe 4.0 ×8
Radeon Pro 5600M (Navi 12)	Jun 15, 2020	RDNA; TSMC N7	Unknown	2560:160:64; 40 CU	1000; 1035	160.0; 165.6	64.00; 66.24	10,240; 10,598	5,120; 5,299	320.0; 331.2	8	394	HBM2; 2048-bit	1540	50 W	PCIe 4.0 ×16

==== Radeon Pro W5000M series ====
Model (Code name)	Release date	Architecture & fab	Transistors & die size	Core		Fillrate (Note: Boost values (if available) are stated below the base value in italic.) (Note: Texture fillrate is calculated as the number of Texture Mapping Units multiplied by the base (or boost) core clock speed.) (Note: Pixel fillrate is calculated as the number of Render Output Units multiplied by the base (or boost) core clock speed.)		Processing power (Note: Precision performance is calculated from the base (or boost) core clock speed based on a FMA operation.) (GFLOPS)			Memory				TDP	Bus interface
Model (Code name)	Release date	Architecture & fab	Transistors & die size	Config (Note: Unified shaders : Texture mapping units : Render output units and Compute units (CU))	Clock (MHz)	Texture (GT/s)	Pixel (GP/s)	Half	Single	Double	Size (GB)	Bandwidth (GB/s)	Bus type & width	Clock (MT/s)	TDP	Bus interface
Radeon Pro W5500M (Navi 14)	Feb 10, 2020	RDNA; TSMC N7	6.4×10^{9} 158 mm^{2}	1408:88:32; 22 CU	1000; 1700	88.00; 149.6	32.00; 54.40	5,632; 9,574	2,816; 4,787	176.0; 299.2	4	224	GDDR6; 128-bit	14000	65-85 W	PCIe 4.0 ×8

==== Radeon Pro W6000M series ====
Model (Code name)	Release date	Architecture & fab	Transistors & die size	Core		Fillrate (Note: Boost values (if available) are stated below the base value in italic.) (Note: Texture fillrate is calculated as the number of Texture Mapping Units multiplied by the base (or boost) core clock speed.) (Note: Pixel fillrate is calculated as the number of Render Output Units multiplied by the base (or boost) core clock speed.)		Processing power (Note: Precision performance is calculated from the base (or boost) core clock speed based on a FMA operation.) (GFLOPS)			Infinity Cache	Memory				TDP	Bus interface
Model (Code name)	Release date	Architecture & fab	Transistors & die size	Config (Note: Unified shaders : Texture mapping units : Render output units : Ray accelerators and Compute units (CU))	Clock (MHz)	Texture (GT/s)	Pixel (GP/s)	Half	Single	Double	Infinity Cache	Size (GB)	Bandwidth (GB/s)	Bus type & width	Clock (MT/s)	TDP	Bus interface
Radeon Pro W6300M (Navi 24)	Jan 19, 2022	RDNA 2 TSMC N6	5.4×10^{9} 107 mm^{2}	768:48:32:12; 12 CU	2214	106.3	70.8	6,801	3,401	212.5	8 MB	2	64	GDDR6; 32-bit	14000	25 W	PCIe 4.0 ×4
Radeon Pro W6500M (Navi 24)	Jan 19, 2022	RDNA 2 TSMC N6	5.4×10^{9} 107 mm^{2}	1024:64:32:16; 16 CU	2588	165.6	82.8	10,478	5,239	327.4	16 MB	4	128	GDDR6; 64-bit	14000	35–50 W	PCIe 4.0 ×4
Radeon Pro W6600M (Navi 23)	Jun 8, 2021	RDNA 2 TSMC N7	11.06×10^{9} 237 mm^{2}	1792:112:64:28; 28 CU	2200; 2900	246.4; 324.8	140.8; 185.6	15,770; 20,787	7,885; 10,394	492.8; 649.6	32 MB	8	224	GDDR6; 128-bit	14000	65–90 W	PCIe 4.0 ×16

=== Data center GPUs ===
==== Radeon Pro V series ====
Model (Code name)	Release date	Architecture & fab	Transistors & die size	Core		Fillrate (Note: Boost values (if available) are stated below the base value in italic.) (Note: Texture fillrate is calculated as the number of Texture Mapping Units multiplied by the base (or boost) core clock speed.) (Note: Pixel fillrate is calculated as the number of Render Output Units multiplied by the base (or boost) core clock speed.)		Processing power (Note: Precision performance is calculated from the base (or boost) core clock speed based on a FMA operation.) (GFLOPS)			L3 cache	Memory				TDP	Bus interface	Graphic output ports
Model (Code name)	Release date	Architecture & fab	Transistors & die size	Config (Note: Unified shaders : Texture mapping units : Render output units : Ray accelerators and Compute units (CU))	Clock (MHz)	Texture (GT/s)	Pixel (GP/s)	Half	Single	Double	L3 cache	Size (GB)	Bandwidth (GB/s)	Bus type & width	Clock (MT/s)	TDP	Bus interface	Graphic output ports
Radeon Pro V320 (Vega 10)	Jun 29, 2017 (Custom SKU)	GCN 5 GF 14LPP	12.5×10^{9} 495 mm^{2}	4096:256:64:- 64 CU	852; 1000	218.1; 256	54.52; 64	13,959; 16,384	6,979; 8,192	436.2; 512	—	8 or 16	484	HBM2; 2048-bit	1890	230 W	PCIe 3.0 ×16	4× miniDP 1.4a
Radeon Pro V340 (Vega 10)	Aug 26, 2018	GCN 5 GF 14LPP	2× / 12.5×10^{9} 495 mm^{2}	2× / 3584:224:64:- 56 CU	852; 1500	2× / 190.8; 336	2× / 54.52; 96	2× / 12,214; 21,504	2× / 6,107; 10,752	2× / 381.7; 672	—	2× 16	2× 484	HBM2; 2× 2048-bit	1890	300 W	PCIe 3.0 ×16	1× miniDP 1.4a
Radeon Pro V520 (Navi 12)	Dec 1, 2020	RDNA; TSMC N7	Unknown	2304:144:64:- 36 CU	1000; 1600	144; 230.4	64; 102.4	9,216; 14,746	4,608; 7,373	288; 460.8	—	8	512	HBM2; 2048-bit	2000	225 W	PCIe 4.0 ×16	—N/a
Radeon Pro V620 (Navi 21)	Nov 4, 2021	RDNA 2 TSMC N7	26.8×10^{9} 520 mm^{2}	4608:288:128:72; 72 CU	1825; 2200	525.6; 633.6	233.6; 281.6	33,638; 40,550	16,819; 20,275	1,051; 1,267	128 MB	32	512	GDDR6; 256-bit	16000	300 W	PCIe 4.0 ×16	—N/a
Radeon Pro V710 (Navi 32)	Oct 3, 2024	RDNA 3 TSMC N5 (GCD); TSMC N6 (MCD)	28.1×10^{9} 384 mm^{2}	3456:216:96:54; 54 CU	1900; 2000	432	192	55,296	28,314	1,728	54 MB	28	448	GDDR6; 224-bit	16000	158 W	PCIe 4.0 ×16	—N/a

== See also ==
- AMD FirePro – AMD's predecessor to Radeon Pro
- AMD Instinct – AMD's professional HPC/GPGPU server solution, successor to FirePro S (server line)
- Nvidia Quadro – Nvidia's competing workstation graphics solution
- Nvidia Tesla – Nvidia's competing GPGPU solution
- List of AMD graphics processing units
