= RDNA 3 =

GPU microarchitecture by AMD

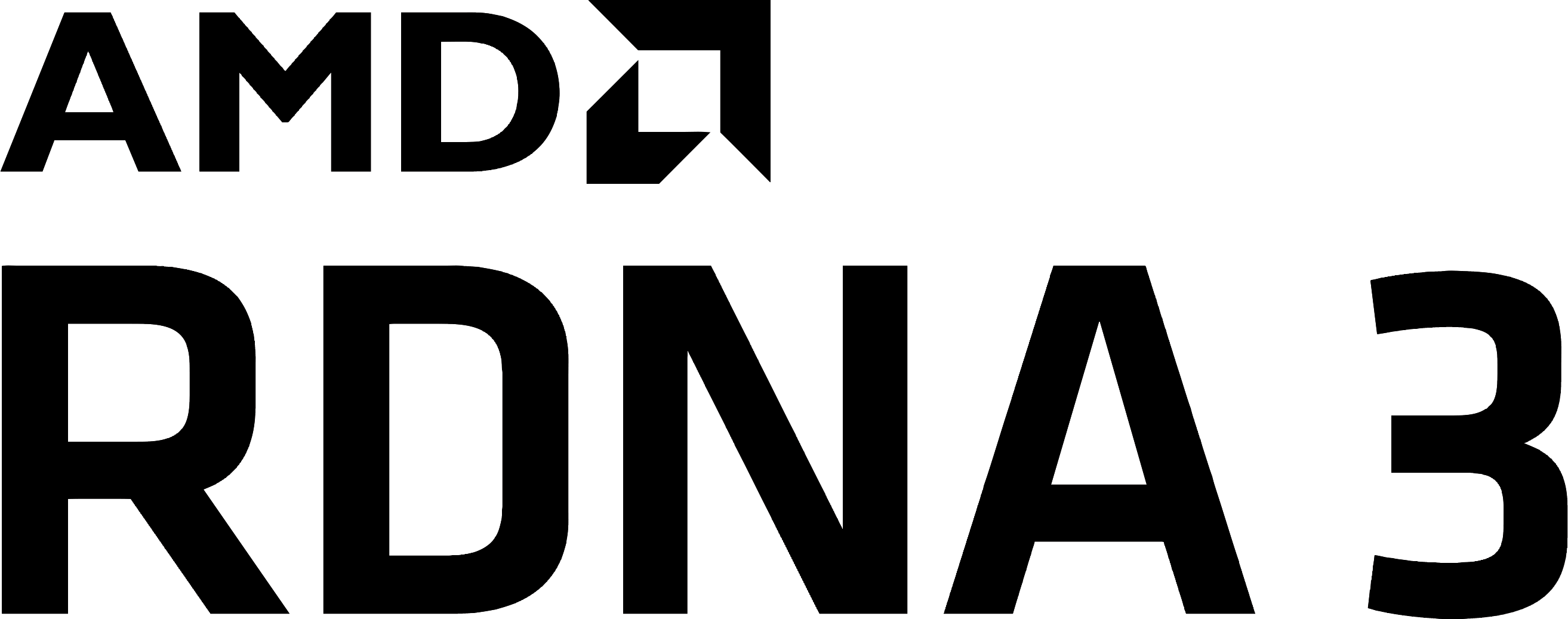
- Launched: December 13, 2022; 3 years ago
- Designed by: AMD
- Manufactured by: TSMC
- Fabrication process: TSMC N4 (APUs); TSMC N5 (GCD); TSMC N6 (Navi 33 and MCD)
- Codenames: Navi 31: Plum Bonito; Navi 32: Wheat Nas; Navi 33: Hotpink Bonefish

Product series
- Desktop: Radeon RX 7000 series
- Professional/workstation: Radeon Pro W7000 series

Specifications
- Compute: Up to 122.8 TFLOPS (FP16); Up to 61.42 TFLOPS (FP32); Up to 1.919 TFLOPS (FP64)
- Clock rate: 1500 MHz to 2500 MHz
- Shader clock rate: 2269 MHz
- L0 cache: 96 KB (per WGP): 32 KB vector cache; 16 KB scalar cache
- L1 cache: 256 KB (per array)
- L2 cache: up to 6 MB
- L3 cache: up to 96 MB (16 MB per MCD)
- Memory support: GDDR6
- Memory clock rate: up to 20 Gbps
- PCIe support: PCIe 4.0

Supported graphics APIs
- Direct3D: Direct3D 12.0 Ultimate (feature level 12_2)
- Shader model: Shader Model 6.7
- OpenGL: OpenGL 4.6
- Vulkan: Vulkan 1.4

Supported compute APIs
- OpenCL: OpenCL 2.1

Media engine
- Encode codecs: H.264; H.265; AV1
- Decode codecs: H.264; H.265; AV1
- Color bit-depth: 8-bit; 10-bit; 12-bit
- Encoders supported: AMF; VCE
- Display outputs: DisplayPort 2.1; HDMI 2.1a; USB-C

History
- Predecessor: RDNA 2
- Variant: CDNA 3 (datacenter)
- Successor: RDNA 4

Support status
- Supported

The AMD RDNA 3 is a microarchitecture for graphics processing units (GPUs) designed by AMD, first released in December 2022, as part of the RDNA series. Graphics cards based on the RDNA 3 are marketed as the RX 7000 series and W7000 series, under the Radeon and Radeon Pro brand, respectively.

A modified design, RDNA 3.5, is released in 2024. It is optimized for better energy efficiency, and targets mobile computing applications. RDNA 3.5-based designs are incorporated as integrated graphics processors (iGPs) into the company's systems on a chip (SoC) products, such as the Ryzen AI 300 series of laptop processors, the Ryzen Z1 for handheld gaming consoles, and the semi-customized chip found inside the Steam Machines.

== Background ==
On June 9, 2022, AMD held their Financial Analyst Day where they presented a client GPU roadmap which contained mention of RDNA 3 coming in 2022 and RDNA 4 coming in 2024. AMD announced to investors their intention to achieve a performance-per-watt uplift of over 50% with RDNA 3 and that the upcoming architecture would be built using chiplet packaging on a 5 nm process.

A sneak preview for RDNA 3 was included towards the end of AMD's Ryzen 7000 unveiling event on August 29, 2022. The preview included RDNA 3 running gameplay of Lies of P, AMD CEO Lisa Su confirming that a chiplet design would be used, and a partial look at AMD's reference design for an RDNA 3 GPU.

Full details for the RDNA 3 architecture were unveiled on November 3, 2022 at an event in Las Vegas.

== Architecture ==
=== Chiplet packaging ===
For the first time ever in a consumer GPU, RDNA 3 utilizes modular chiplets rather than a single large monolithic die. AMD previously had great success with its use of chiplets in its Ryzen desktop and Epyc server processors. The decision to move to a chiplet-based GPU microarchitecture was led by AMD Senior Vice President Sam Naffziger who had also lead the chiplet initiative with Ryzen and Epyc. The development of RDNA 3's chiplet architecture began towards the end of 2017 with Naffziger leading the AMD graphics team in the effort. The benefit of using chiplets is that dies can be fabricated on different process nodes depending on their functions and intended purpose. According to Naffziger, cache and SRAM do not scale as linearly as logic does on advanced nodes like N5 in terms of density and power consumption so they can instead be fabricated on the cheaper, more mature N6 node. The use of smaller dies rather than one large monolithic die is beneficial for maximizing wafer yields as more dies can be fitted onto a single wafer. Alternatively, a large monolithic RDNA 3 die built on N5 would be more expensive to produce with lower yields.

RDNA 3 uses two types of chiplets: the Graphics Compute Die (GCD) and Memory Cache Dies (MCDs). On Ryzen and Epyc processors, AMD used its PCIe-based Infinity Fabric protocol with the package's dies connected via traces on an organic substrate. This approach is easily scalable in a cost-effective manner but has the drawbacks of increased latency, increased power consumption when moving data between dies at around 1.5 picojoules per bit, and it cannot achieve the connection density needed for high-bandwidth GPUs. An organic package could not host the number of wires that would be needed to connect multiple dies in a GPU. data

RDNA 3's dies are instead connected using TSMC's Integrated Fan-Out Re-Distribution Layer (InFO-RDL) packaging technique which provides a silicon bridge for high bandwidth and high density die-to-die communication. InFO allows dies to be connected without the use of a more costly silicon interposer such as the one used in AMD's Instinct MI200 and MI300 datacenter accelerators. Each Infinity Fanout link has 9.2 Gbps in bandwidth. Naffziger explains that "The bandwidth density that we achieve is almost 10x" with the Infinity Fanout rather than the wires used by Ryzen and Epyc processors. The chiplet interconnects in RDNA achieve cumulative bandwidth of 5.3 TB/s.

=== Memory Cache Dies (MCDs) ===
With a respective 2.05 billion transistors, each Memory Cache Die (MCD) contains 16 MB of L3 cache. Theoretically, additional L3 cache could be added to the MCDs via AMD's 3D V-Cache die stacking technology as the MCDs contain unused TSV connection points. Also present on each MCD are two physical 32-bit GDDR6 memory interfaces for a combined 64-bit interface per MCD. The Radeon RX 7900 XTX has a 384-bit memory bus through the use of six MCDs while the RX 7900 XT has a 320-bit bus due to its five MCDs.

=== Graphics Compute Die (GCD) ===
==== Compute Units ====
RDNA 3's Compute Units (CUs) for graphics processing are organized in dual CU Work Group Processors (WGPs). Rather than including a very large number of WGPs in RDNA 3 GPUs, AMD instead focused on improving per-WGP throughput. This is done with improved dual-issue shader ALUs with the ability to execute two instructions per cycle. It can contain up to 96 graphics Compute Units that can provide up to 61 TFLOPS of compute.

RDNA 3 includes a scheduler for AI acceleration to allow the GPU to schedule matrix instructions on the normal compute cores, so the efficiency of running inference tasks on FP16 execution resources is improved with wave matrix multiply–accumulate (WMMA) instructions. This results in increased inference performance compared to RDNA 2. WMMA supports FP16, BF16, INT8, and INT4 data types. Tom's Hardware found that AMD's fastest RDNA 3 GPU, the RX 7900 XTX, was capable of generating 26 images per minute with Stable Diffusion, compared to only 6.6 images per minute of the RX 6950 XT, the fastest RDNA 2 GPU.

==== Ray tracing ====
RDNA 3 features second generation ray-tracing accelerators. Each Compute Unit contains one ray tracing accelerator. The overall number of ray tracing accelerators is increased due to the higher number of Compute Units, though the number of ray tracing accelerators per Compute Unit has not increased over RDNA 2.

==== Clock speeds ====
RDNA 3 was designed to support high clock speeds. On RDNA 3, clock speeds have been decoupled with the front end operating at a 2.5 GHz frequency while the shaders operate at 2.3 GHz. The shaders operating at a lower clock speed gives up to 25% power savings according to AMD and RDNA 3's shader clock speed is still 15% faster than RDNA 2.

==== Cache and memory subsystem ====
RDNA 3 increased the capacity of L1 and L2 caches. The 16-way associative L1 cache shared across a shader array is doubled in RDNA 3 to 256 KB. The L2 cache increased from 4 MB on RDNA 2 to 6 MB on RDNA 3. The L3 Infinity Cache has been lowered in capacity from 128 MB to 96 MB and latency has increased as it is physically present on the MCDs rather than being closer to the WGPs within the GCD. The Infinity Cache capacity was decreased due to RDNA 3 having wider a memory interface up to 384-bit whereas RDNA 2 used memory interfaces up to 256-bit. RDNA 3 having a wider 384-bit memory means that its cache hitrate does not have to be as high to still avoid bandwidth bottlenecks as there is higher memory bandwidth. RDNA 3 GPUs use GDDR6 memory rather than faster GDDR6X due to the latter's increased power consumption.

==== Media engine ====
RDNA 3 is the first RDNA architecture to have a dedicated media engine. It is built into the GCD and is based on VCN 4.0 encoding and decoding core. AMD's AMF AV1 encoder is comparable in quality to Nvidia's NVENC AV1 encoder but can handle a higher number of simultaneous encoding streams compared to the limit of 3 on the GeForce RTX 40 series.

Supported encoding frame rates (FPS) per resolution and video coding format
Resolution	H.264	H.265	AV1
1080p60	360	360	360
1440p60	360	360	360
4K60	180	180	240
8K60	48	48	60

=== Display engine ===
RDNA 3 GPUs feature a new display engine called the "Radiance Display Engine". AMD touted its support for DisplayPort 2.1 UHBR 13.5, delivering up to 54Gbps bandwidth for high refresh rates at 4K and 8K resolutions. The Radeon Pro W7900 and W7800 support the 80Gbps UHBR20 standard. DisplayPort 2.1 can support 4K at 480 Hz and 8K at 165 Hz with Display Stream Compression (DSC). The previous DisplayPort 1.4 standard with DSC was limited to 4K at 240 Hz and 8K at 60 Hz.

=== Power efficiency ===
AMD claims that RDNA 3 achieves a 54% increase in performance-per-watt which is in line with their previous claims of 50% performance-per-watt increases for both RDNA and RDNA 2.

== Navi 3x dies ==
			Graphics Compute Die (GCD)			Memory Cache Die (MCD)
			Navi 31	Navi 32	Navi 33	Memory Cache Die (MCD)
Launch			Dec 2022	Sep 2023	Jan 2023	Dec 2022
Codename			Plum Bonito	Wheat Nas	Hotpink Bonefish	—N/a
Compute units (Stream processors) [FP32 cores]			96 (6144) [12288]	60 (3840) [7680]	32 (2048) [4096]	—N/a
Process			TSMC N5		TSMC N6	
Transistors			45.4 bn.	28.1 bn.	13.3 bn.	2.05 bn.
Transistor density			150.2 MTr/mm^{2}	143.4 MTr/mm^{2}	65.2 MTr/mm^{2}	54.64 MTr/mm^{2}
Die size			304.35 mm^{2}	196 mm^{2}	204 mm^{2}	37.52 mm^{2}
Products	Consumer	Desktop	RX 7900 GRE; RX 7900 XT; RX 7900 XTX	RX 7700 XT; RX 7800 XT	RX 7600; RX 7600 XT; RX 7650 GRE	RX 7700 XT (3×); RX 7800 XT (4×); RX 7900 GRE (4×); RX 7900 XT (5×); RX 7900 XTX (6×)
Products	Consumer	Mobile	RX 7900M	RX 7800M	RX 7600S; RX 7600M; RX 7600M XT; RX 7700S	RX 7900M (4×)
Products	Workstation	Desktop	W7800; W7900	W7700	W7500; W7600	W7700 (4×); W7800 (4×); W7900 (6×)
Products	Workstation	Mobile	—N/a	—N/a	—N/a	—N/a

== RDNA 3.5 Optimizations ==
At AI PC Innovation Summit in March 2024 AMD announced "Strix Point" codenamed CPUs. The announcement confirmed inclusion of "RDNA 3+" graphics technology in new onboard graphics on then-future Zen 5 processors.

In July 2024, AMD shared technical details about the optimizations in RDNA 3+, now called RDNA 3.5. The reveal stated that the goal of RDNA 3.5 was to remove performance bottlenecks that AMD's GPUs come across when used in low-power configurations like laptops and handheld gaming PCs. The reveal presentation stated Strix Point achieved 19-32% higher performance at 15W compared to Hawk Point.

Compared to RDNA 3, the revised RDNA 3.5 doubles the per-cycle texel output from texture units housed in compute units. This compensates for lower core clock speeds used in low-power situations. Most rich vector shader instructions for interpolation and comparison are also double rate compared to RDNA 3. This increases performance per watt. Finally, LPDDR5 memory management is optimized with improved compression and batch processing to reduce costly memory accesses.

At CES 2025 in January 2025, AMD announced the Z2 series of processors. This line-up included the Z2 Extreme, the first low-power CPU with integrated RDNA 3.5 graphics. At the same event, AMD announced the "Strix Halo" processors aimed at higher TDP. Those also include RDNA 3.5 graphics with higher GPU core counts and base clocks.

== Products ==
=== Gaming ===
==== Desktop ====
Model (Code name)	Release Date & Price	Architecture & fab	Chiplets	Transistors & die size (Note: Approximate die size of all active dies (one GCD and up to six MCD).)	Core		Fillrate (Note: Boost values (if available) are stated below the base value in italic.) (Note: Texture fillrate is calculated as the number of Texture Mapping Units multiplied by the base (or boost) core clock speed.) (Note: Pixel fillrate is calculated as the number of Render Output Units multiplied by the base (or boost) core clock speed.)		Processing power (Note: Precision performance is calculated from the base (or boost) core clock speed based on a FMA operation.) (TFLOPS)			Infinity Cache		Memory				TBP	Bus interface
Model (Code name)	Release Date & Price	Architecture & fab	Chiplets	Transistors & die size	Config (Note: Unified shaders : Texture mapping units : Render output units : Ray accelerators : AI accelerators and Compute Units (CU))	Clock (MHz)	Texture (GT/s)	Pixel (GP/s)	Half (Note: Officially declared half-precision performance is twice of the one shown here due to being based on different operation (a×b+c×d+e).)	Single	Double	Size	Bandwidth (GB/s)	Size	Bandwidth (GB/s)	Bus type & width	Clock (MT/s)	TBP	Bus interface
Radeon RX 7400 (Navi 33)	Aug 10, 2025; OEM	RDNA 3 TSMC N6	Monolithic	13.3×10^{9} 204 mm^{2}	1792:112:64:28:56; 28 CU	1100			15.77	7.88	0.123	32 MB	362	8 GB	173	GDDR6; 128-bit	10800	55 W	PCIe 4.0 ×8
Steam Machine GPU (Navi 33)	Jun 22, 2026; OEM	RDNA 3 TSMC N6	Monolithic	13.3×10^{9} 204 mm^{2}	1792:112:64:28:56; 28 CU	2450			35.12	17.56	0.274	32 MB		8 GB		GDDR6; 128-bit		110 W	PCIe 4.0 ×8
Radeon RX 7600 (Navi 33)	May 25, 2023 $269 USD	RDNA 3 TSMC N6	Monolithic	13.3×10^{9} 204 mm^{2}	2048:128:64:32:64; 32 CU	1720; 2655	220.2; 339.8	110.1; 169.9	14.09; 21.75	14.09; 21.75	0.220; 0.340	32 MB	476.9	8 GB	288	GDDR6; 128-bit	18000	165 W	PCIe 4.0 ×8
Radeon RX 7650 GRE (Navi 33)	Feb 7, 2025; China Only ¥2,049 RMB ($249 USD)	RDNA 3 TSMC N6	Monolithic	13.3×10^{9} 204 mm^{2}	2048:128:64:32:64; 32 CU	1720; 2695	220.2; 345.0	110.1; 172.5	14.09; 22.08	14.09; 22.08	0.220; 0.345	32 MB	476.9	8 GB	288	GDDR6; 128-bit	18000	170 W	PCIe 4.0 ×8
Radeon RX 7600 XT (Navi 33)	Jan 24, 2024 $329 USD	RDNA 3 TSMC N6	Monolithic	13.3×10^{9} 204 mm^{2}	2048:128:64:32:64; 32 CU	1720; 2755	220.2; 352.6	110.1; 176.3	14.09; 22.57	14.09; 22.57	0.220; 0.353	32 MB	476.9	16 GB	288	GDDR6; 128-bit	18000	190 W	PCIe 4.0 ×8
Radeon RX 7700 (Navi 32)	Sep 18, 2025; OEM	RDNA 3 TSMC N5 (GCD); TSMC N6 (MCD)	1 × GCD; 4 × MCD	28.1×10^{9} 346 mm^{2}	2560:160:64:40:80; 40 CU	1900; 2459	304; 393.4	121.6; 157.4	19.47; 25.20	19.47; 25.20	0.304; 0.394	40 MB	1927	16 GB	624	GDDR6; 256-bit	19500	263 W	PCIe 4.0 ×16
Radeon RX 7700 XT (Navi 32)	Sep 6, 2023 $449 USD	RDNA 3 TSMC N5 (GCD); TSMC N6 (MCD)	1 × GCD; 3 × MCD	28.1×10^{9} 346 mm^{2}	3456:216:96:54:108; 54 CU	1900; 2544	410.4; 549.5	182.4; 244.2	26.27; 35.17	26.27; 35.17	0.410; 0.550	48 MB	1995	12 GB	432	GDDR6; 192-bit	18000	245 W	PCIe 4.0 ×16
Radeon RX 7800 XT (Navi 32)	Sep 6, 2023 $499 USD	RDNA 3 TSMC N5 (GCD); TSMC N6 (MCD)	1 × GCD; 4 × MCD	28.1×10^{9} 346 mm^{2}	3840:240:96:60:120; 60 CU	1800; 2430	432; 583.2	172.8; 233.2	27.64; 37.32	27.64; 37.32	0.432; 0.583	64 MB	2708	16 GB	624	GDDR6; 256-bit	19500	263 W	PCIe 4.0 ×16
Radeon RX 7900 GRE (Navi 31)	Jul 27, 2023; China only, Feb 27, 2024 $549 USD	RDNA 3 TSMC N5 (GCD); TSMC N6 (MCD)	1 × GCD; 4 × MCD	57.7×10^{9} 529 mm^{2}	5120:320:160:80:160; 80 CU	1270; 2245	406.4; 718.4	243.8; 431.0	26.01; 45.98	26.01; 45.98	0.406; 0.718	64 MB	2250	16 GB	576	GDDR6; 256-bit	18000	260 W	PCIe 4.0 ×16
Radeon RX 7900 XT (Navi 31)	Dec 13, 2022 $899 USD	RDNA 3 TSMC N5 (GCD); TSMC N6 (MCD)	1 × GCD; 5 × MCD	57.7×10^{9} 529 mm^{2}	5376:336:192:84:168; 84 CU	1500; 2400	504.0; 806.4	288.0; 460.8	32.26; 51.61	32.26; 51.61	0.504; 0.806	80 MB	2900	20 GB	800	GDDR6; 320-bit	20000	315 W	PCIe 4.0 ×16
Radeon RX 7900 XTX (Navi 31)	Dec 13, 2022 $999 USD	RDNA 3 TSMC N5 (GCD); TSMC N6 (MCD)	1 × GCD; 6 × MCD	57.7×10^{9} 529 mm^{2}	6144:384:192:96:192; 96 CU	1900; 2500	729.6; 960.0	364.8; 480.0	46.69; 61.44	46.69; 61.44	0.730; 0.960	96 MB	3500	24 GB	960	GDDR6; 384-bit	20000	355 W	PCIe 4.0 ×16

==== Mobile ====
Model (Code name)	Release date	Architecture & fab	Chiplets	Transistors & die size	Core		Fillrate (Note: Boost values (if available) are stated below the base value in italic.) (Note: Texture fillrate is calculated as the number of Texture Mapping Units multiplied by the base (or boost) core clock speed.) (Note: Pixel fillrate is calculated as the number of Render Output Units multiplied by the base (or boost) core clock speed.)		Processing power (Note: Precision performance is calculated from the base (or boost) core clock speed based on a FMA operation.) (TFLOPS) (Note: GPUs based on RDNA 3 have dual-issue stream processors so that up to two shader instructions can be executed per clock cycle under certain parallelism conditions.)			Infinity Cache	Memory				TDP	Interface
Model (Code name)	Release date	Architecture & fab	Chiplets	Transistors & die size	Config (Note: Unified shaders : Texture mapping units : Render output units : Ray accelerators : AI accelerators and Compute units (CU))	Clock (MHz)	Texture (GT/s)	Pixel (GP/s)	Half (Note: Officially declared half-precision performance is twice of the one shown here due to being based on different operation (a×b+c×d+e).)	Single	Double	Infinity Cache	Size	Bandwidth (GB/s)	Bus type & width	Clock (MT/s)	TDP	Interface
Radeon RX 7600S (Navi 33)	Jan 4, 2023	RDNA 3 TSMC N6	Monolithic	13.3×10^{9} 204 mm^{2}	1792:112:64:28:56; 28 CU	1500; 2200	168.0; 246.4	96.00; 140.8	10.75; 15.77	10.75; 15.77	0.168; 0.246	32 MB	8 GB	256	GDDR6; 128-bit	16000	75 W	PCIe 4.0 ×8
Radeon RX 7600M (Navi 33)	Jan 4, 2023	RDNA 3 TSMC N6	Monolithic	13.3×10^{9} 204 mm^{2}	1792:112:64:28:56; 28 CU	1500; 2410	168.0; 269.9	96.0; 154.2	10.75; 17.28	10.75; 17.28	0.168; 0.270	32 MB	8 GB	256	GDDR6; 128-bit	16000	90 W	PCIe 4.0 ×8
Radeon RX 7600M XT (Navi 33)	Jan 4, 2023	RDNA 3 TSMC N6	Monolithic	13.3×10^{9} 204 mm^{2}	2048:128:64:32:64; 32 CU	1500; 2615	192.0; 334.1	96.00; 167.0	12.29; 21.42	12.29; 21.42	0.192; 0.335	32 MB	8 GB	288	GDDR6; 128-bit	18000	120 W	PCIe 4.0 ×8
Radeon RX 7700S (Navi 33)	Jan 4, 2023	RDNA 3 TSMC N6	Monolithic	13.3×10^{9} 204 mm^{2}	2048:128:64:32:64; 32 CU	1500; 2500	192.0; 320.0	96.0; 160.0	12.29; 20.48	12.29; 20.48	0.192; 0.320	32 MB	8 GB	288	GDDR6; 128-bit	18000	100 W	PCIe 4.0 ×8
Radeon RX 7800M (Navi 32)	Sep 11, 2024	RDNA 3 TSMC N5 (GCD); TSMC N6 (MCD)	1 × GCD; 3 × MCD	28.1×10^{9} 346 mm^{2}	3840:240:96:60:120; 60 CU	2335	560.4	224.2	35.87	35.87	0.560	48 MB	12 GB	432	GDDR6; 192-bit	18000	180 W	?
Radeon RX 7900M (Navi 31)	Oct 19, 2023	RDNA 3 TSMC N5 (GCD); TSMC N6 (MCD)	1 × GCD; 4 × MCD	57.7×10^{9} 529 mm^{2}	4608:288:192:72:144; 72 CU	1825; 2090	525.6; 601.9	350.4; 401.3	33.64; 38.52	33.64; 38.52	0.526; 0.602	64 MB	16 GB	576	GDDR6; 256-bit	18000	180 W	PCIe 4.0 ×16

=== Workstation ===
==== Desktop workstation ====
Model (Code name)	Release date & price	Architecture & fab	Chiplets (active)	Transistors & die size (Note: Approximate die size of entire MCM package that consists of single GCD (Graphics Compute Die) and six MCDs (Memory Cache Die). Radeon Pro W7800 has only four active MCDs, inactive one is for structural support and heat dissipation.)	Core		Fillrate (Note: Boost values (if available) are stated below the base value in italic.) (Note: Texture fillrate is calculated as the number of Texture Mapping Units multiplied by the base (or boost) core clock speed.) (Note: Pixel fillrate is calculated as the number of Render Output Units multiplied by the base (or boost) core clock speed.)		Processing power (Note: Precision performance is calculated from the base (or boost) core clock speed based on a FMA operation.) (TFLOPS)			Infinity Cache	Memory				TDP	Bus interface
Model (Code name)	Release date & price	Architecture & fab	Chiplets (active)	Transistors & die size	Config (Note: Unified shaders : Texture mapping units : Render output units : Ray accelerators : AI accelerators and Compute units (CU)) (Note: GPUs based on RDNA 3 have dual-issue stream processors so that up to two shader instructions can be executed per clock cycle under certain parallelism conditions.)	Clock (MHz)	Texture (GT/s)	Pixel (GP/s)	Half	Single	Double	Infinity Cache	Size (GB)	Bandwidth (GB/s)	Bus type & width	Clock (MT/s)	TDP	Bus interface
Radeon Pro W7500 (Navi 33)	Aug 3, 2023 $429 USD	RDNA 3 TSMC N6	—N/a	13.3×10^{9} 204 mm^{2}	1792:112:64; 28:56:28 CU	1500; 1700	168.0; 190.4	96.0; 108.8	24.37	12.19	0.381	32 MB	8	288	GDDR6; 128-bit	18000	70 W	PCIe 4.0 ×8
Radeon Pro W7600 (Navi 33)	Aug 3, 2023 $599 USD	RDNA 3 TSMC N6	—N/a	13.3×10^{9} 204 mm^{2}	2048:128:64; 32:64:32 CU	1720; 2440	220.1; 312.3	110.0; 156.2	39.98	19.99	0.625	32 MB	8	288	GDDR6; 128-bit	18000	130 W	PCIe 4.0 ×8
Radeon Pro W7700 (Navi 32)	Nov 13, 2023 $999 USD	RDNA 3 TSMC N5 (GCD); TSMC N6 (MCD)	1 × GCD; 4 × MCD	28.1×10^{9} ~346 mm^{2}	3072:192:96; 48:96:48 CU	1900; 2600	364.8; 499.2	182.4; 249.2	56.54	28.3	0.884	64 MB	16	576	GDDR6; 256-bit	18000	190 W	PCIe 4.0 ×16
Radeon Pro W7800 (Navi 31)	Apr 13, 2023 $2499 USD	RDNA 3 TSMC N5 (GCD); TSMC N6 (MCD)	1 × GCD; 4 × MCD	57.7×10^{9} ~531 mm^{2}	4480:280:128; 70:128:70 CU	1855; 2499	519.4; 699.7	237.4; 319.8	90.50	45.25	1.414	64 MB	32	576	GDDR6; 256-bit	18000	260 W	PCIe 4.0 ×16
Radeon Pro W7800 48GB (Navi 31)	Dec 2024	RDNA 3 TSMC N5 (GCD); TSMC N6 (MCD)	1 × GCD; 6 × MCD	57.7×10^{9} ~531 mm^{2}	4480:280:128; 70:128:70 CU	1855; 2499	519.4; 699.7	237.4; 319.8	90.50	45.25	1.414	96 MB	48	864	GDDR6; 384-bit	18000	281 W	PCIe 4.0 ×16
Radeon Pro W7900 Dual Slot (Navi 31)	Jun 19, 2024 $3499 USD	RDNA 3 TSMC N5 (GCD); TSMC N6 (MCD)	1 × GCD; 6 × MCD	57.7×10^{9} ~531 mm^{2}	6144:384:192; 96:192:96 CU	1855; 2495	712.3; 958.0	356.1; 479.0	122.6	61.32	1.916	96 MB	48	864	GDDR6; 384-bit	18000	295 W	PCIe 4.0 ×16
Radeon Pro W7900 (Navi 31)	Apr 13, 2023 $3999 USD	RDNA 3 TSMC N5 (GCD); TSMC N6 (MCD)	1 × GCD; 6 × MCD	57.7×10^{9} ~531 mm^{2}	6144:384:192; 96:192:96 CU	1855; 2495	712.3; 958.0	356.1; 479.0	122.6	61.32	1.916	96 MB	48	864	GDDR6; 384-bit	18000	295 W	PCIe 4.0 ×16

=== Integrated graphics processing units (iGPUs) ===
Model	Launch	Codename	Architecture & fab	Die size	Core		Fillrate (Note: Boost values (if available) are stated below the base value in italic.) (Note: Texture fillrate is calculated as the number of Texture Mapping Units multiplied by the base (or boost) core clock speed.) (Note: Pixel fillrate is calculated as the number of Render Output Units multiplied by the base (or boost) core clock speed.)		Processing power (Note: Precision performance is calculated from the base (or boost) core clock speed based on a FMA operation.) (GFLOPS)			Cache				Memory	TDP
Model	Launch	Codename	Architecture & fab	Die size	Config (Note: Compute Units (CUs) Stream Processors : Texture mapping units : Render output units : Ray accelerators) (Note: GPUs based on RDNA 3 have dual-issue stream processors so that up to two shader instructions can be executed per clock cycle under certain parallelism conditions.)	Clock (MHz)	Texture (GT/s)	Pixel (GP/s)	Half [FP16]	Single [FP32]	Double [FP64]	L0	L1	L2	L3	Bus type & width	TDP
RDNA 3
Radeon 740M	Apr 2023	Phoenix; Hawk Point	RDNA 3 TSMC N4	178 mm^{2}	4 CUs; 256:16:8:4	2,500	40.0	20.0	5,120	2,560	80.0	192 KB	512 KB	2 MB	NA	DDR5 / LPDDR5(X) 128-bit	15–30 W
Radeon 760M	Apr 2023	Phoenix; Hawk Point	RDNA 3 TSMC N4	178 mm^{2}	8 CUs; 512:32:16:8	2,600	83.2	41.6	10,650	5,325	166.4	384 KB	512 KB	2 MB	NA	DDR5 / LPDDR5(X) 128-bit	15–65 W
Radeon 780M	Apr 2023	Phoenix; Hawk Point	RDNA 3 TSMC N4	178 mm^{2}	12 CUs; 768:48:24:12	2,800	134.4	67.2	17,203	8,602	268.8	1.125 MB	512 KB	2 MB	NA	DDR5 / LPDDR5(X) 128-bit	15–65 W
Ryzen Z1	Jun 13, 2023	Phoenix; Hawk Point	RDNA 3 TSMC N4	178 mm^{2}	4 CUs; 256:16:8:4	2,500	40.0	20.0	5,120	2,560	80.0	192 KB	512 KB	2 MB	NA	LPDDR5(X) 128-bit	9–30 W
Ryzen Z1 Extreme	Jun 13, 2023	Phoenix; Hawk Point	RDNA 3 TSMC N4	178 mm^{2}	12 CUs; 768:48:24:12	2,800	134.4	67.2	17,203	8,602	268.8	1.125 MB	512 KB	2 MB	NA	LPDDR5(X) 128-bit	9–30 W
RDNA 3.5
Radeon 880M	Jul 2024	Strix Point	RDNA 3.5; TSMC N4P	232.5 mm^{2}	12 CUs; 768:48:24:12	2,900	139.2	69.6	17,818	8,909	278.4	1.125 MB	512 KB	2 MB	NA	DDR5 / LPDDR5(X) 128-bit	15–54 W
Radeon 890M	Jul 2024	Strix Point	RDNA 3.5; TSMC N4P	232.5 mm^{2}	16 CUs; 1024:64:32:16	2,900	185.6	92.8	23,757	11,878	371.2	1.5 MB	512 KB	2 MB	NA	DDR5 / LPDDR5(X) 128-bit	15–54 W
Radeon 820M	Jan 2025	Kraken point	RDNA 3.5; TSMC N4P		2 CUs 128:8:4:2	2800							512 KB	2 MB	NA	DDR5 / LPDDR5(X) 128-bit	15–54 W
Radeon 840M	Jan 2025	Krackan Point	RDNA 3.5; TSMC N4P		4 CUs 256:16:8:4	2,900	46.4	23.3	5,939	2,969	92.8	192 KB	512 KB	2 MB	NA	DDR5 / LPDDR5(X) 128-bit	15–54 W
Radeon 860M	Jan 2025	Krackan Point	RDNA 3.5; TSMC N4P		8 CUs 512:32:16:8	3,000	96	48	12,288	6,144	192	384 KB	512 KB	2 MB	NA	DDR5 / LPDDR5(X) 128-bit	15–54 W
Radeon 8040S	Jan 2025	Strix Halo	RDNA 3.5; TSMC N4P	233 mm^{2}	16 CUs 1024:64:32:16	2,800	179.2	89.6	22,937	11,468	358	1.5 MB	512 KB	2 MB	32 MB	LPDDR5X 256-bit	45-120 W
Radeon 8050S	Jan 2025	Strix Halo	RDNA 3.5; TSMC N4P	308 mm^{2}	32 CUs 2048:128:64:32	2,800	358.4	179.2	45,875	22,937	716	3 MB	512 KB	2 MB	32 MB	LPDDR5X 256-bit	45-120 W
Radeon 8060S	Jan 2025	Strix Halo	RDNA 3.5; TSMC N4P	308 mm^{2}	40 CUs 2560:160:80:40	2,900	464	232	59,392	29,696	928	3.75 MB	512 KB	2 MB	32 MB	LPDDR5X 256-bit	45-120 W
