= Sam Naffziger =

American electrical engineer

- Born: Samuel Naffziger
- Education: California Institute of Technology (BS); Stanford University (MSc)
- Employer: AMD

Samuel Naffziger is an American electrical engineer who has been employed at Advanced Micro Devices in Fort Collins, Colorado since 2006. He was named a Fellow of the Institute of Electrical and Electronics Engineers (IEEE) in 2014 for his leadership in the development of power management and low-power processor technologies. He is also the Senior Vice President and Product Technology Architect at AMD.

== Education ==
Naffziger received a Bachelor of Science degree in electrical engineering from the California Institute of Technology and a Master of Science in computer engineering from Stanford University.

== Career ==
=== Early career ===
For eight years, Naffziger led the Itanium design team at Hewlett-Packard before moving to Intel in 2002. At Intel, Naffziger played a leading role in the introduction of two major Itanium models at the International Solid State Circuits Conference, the McKinley processor in 2002 and Montecito in 2005.

=== 2006-present: Advanced Micro Devices ===
Naffziger was an architect lead on AMD's Ryzen processors that launched in March 2017. He was the lead advocate for AMD's Ryzen and Epyc lines to move to a modular, chiplet-based approach. Towards the end of 2017, Naffziger began to lead the AMD graphics team in bringing a chiplet architecture to graphics with the RDNA 3 architecture, released in 2022.

== Academic works ==
- Wang, Alice; Naffziger, Samuel, eds. (2010). Adaptive Techniques for Dynamic Processor Optimization: Theory and Practice (PDF). Cham: Springer. ISBN 978-0-387-76471-9.
- Singh, Teja; Schaefer, Alex; Rangarajan, Sundar; John, Deepesh; Henrion, Carson; Schreiber, Russell; Rodriguez, Miguel; Kosonocky, Stephen; Naffziger, Samuel; Novak, Amy (2018). "Zen: An Energy-Efficient High-Performance x86 Core". IEEE Journal of Solid-State Circuits. 53 (1): 102–114. doi:10.1109/JSSC.2017.2752839.
- Naffziger, Samuel; Beck, Noah; Burd, Thomas; Lepak, Kevin; Loh, Gabriel H.; Subramony, Mahesh; White, Sean (2021). Pioneering Chiplet Technology and Design for the AMD EPYC™ and Ryzen™ Processor Families: Industrial Product. 2021 ACM/IEEE 48th Annual International Symposium on Computer Architecture (ISCA). Valencia, Spain. pp. 57–70.
- Papermaster, Mark; Kosonocky, Stephen; Loh, Gabriel H.; Naffziger, Samuel (2021). A New Era of Tailored Computing. 2021 Symposium on VLSI Circuits. Kyoto, Japan. pp. 1–2.
- Wuu, John; Agarwal, Rahul; Ciraula, Michael; Dietz, Carl; Johnson, Brett; Johnson, Dave; Schreiber, Russell; Swaminathan, Raja; Walker, Will; Naffziger, Samuel (2022). 3D V-Cache: the Implementation of a Hybrid-Bonded 64MB Stacked Cache for a 7nm x86-64 CPU. 2022 IEEE International Solid- State Circuits Conference (ISSCC). San Francisco, CA. pp. 428–429.
