= Texel (graphics) =

Fundamental unit of a texture map

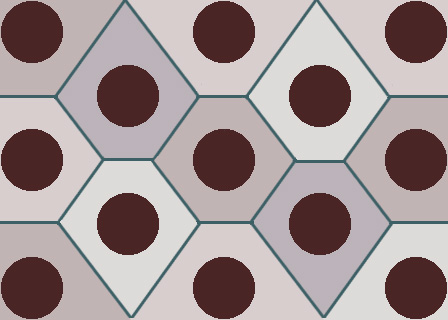
Voronoi polygons for a group of texels

In computer graphics, a texel, texture element, or texture pixel is the fundamental unit of a texture map. Textures are represented by arrays of texels representing the texture space, just as other images are represented by arrays of pixels.

Texels can also be described by image regions that are obtained through simple procedures such as thresholding. Voronoi tesselation can be used to define their spatial relationships—divisions are made at the midpoints between the centroids of each texel and the centroids of every surrounding texel for the entire texture. This results in each texel centroid having a Voronoi polygon surrounding it, which consists of all points that are closer to its own texel centroid than any other centroid.

== Rendering ==
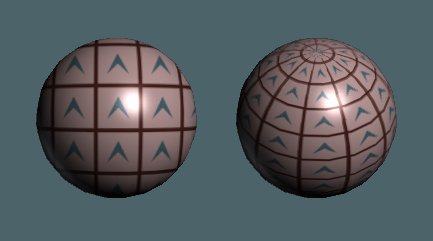
Two different projector functions

When texturing a 3D surface or surfaces (a process known as texture mapping), the renderer maps texels to appropriate pixels in the geometric fragment (typically a triangle) in the output picture. On modern computers, this operation is accomplished on the graphics processing unit.

The texturing process starts with a location in space. The location can be in world space, but typically it is local to a model space so that the texture moves with the model. A projector function is applied to the location to change the location from a three-element vector ($\left (x,y,z \right )$) to a two-element ($\left (u,v\right )$) vector with values ranging from zero to one (uv). These values are multiplied by the resolution of the texture to obtain the location of the texel. When a texel is requested that is not on an integer position, texture filtering is applied.

When a texel is requested that is outside of the texture, one of two techniques is used: clamping or wrapping. Clamping limits the texel to the texture size, moving it to the nearest edge if it is more than the texture size. Wrapping moves the texel in increments of the texture's size to bring it back into the texture. Wrapping causes a texture to be repeated; clamping causes it to be in one spot only.

== See also ==
- Resel
- Voxel
