= Radeon 200 series =

Series of video cards

- Release date: October 8, 2013; 13 years ago
- Codename: Southern Islands; Sea Islands; Volcanic Islands
- Architecture: TeraScale 2; GCN 1st gen; GCN 2nd gen; GCN 3rd gen
- Transistors: 370M (Caicos) 40 nm; 950M (Oland) 28 nm; 1.500M (Cape Verde) 28 nm; 2.080M (Bonaire) 28 nm; 2.800M (Pitcairn) 28 nm; 4.313M (Tahiti) 28 nm; 5.000M (Tonga) 28 nm; 6.200M (Hawaii) 28 nm; 2 x 6.200M (Vesuvius) 28 nm

Cards
- Entry-level: Radeon R5 220; Radeon R5 230; Radeon R5 235; Radeon R5 235X; Radeon R5 240; Radeon R7 240; Radeon R7 250; Radeon R7 250E
- Mid-range: Radeon R7 250X; Radeon R7 260; Radeon R7 260X; Radeon R7 265; Radeon R9 270; Radeon R9 270X
- High-end: Radeon R9 280; Radeon R9 280X; Radeon R9 285
- Enthusiast: Radeon R9 290; Radeon R9 290X; Radeon R9 290X2; Radeon R9 295X2

API support
- Direct3D: Direct3D 12.0 (feature level 12_0) (GCN 2nd gen and higher); Shader Model 6.5 (GCN) or Shader Model 5.0
- OpenCL: OpenCL 2.1 (GCN version)
- OpenGL: OpenGL 4.5; OpenGL 4.6 (GCN only, Windows 7+ and Adrenalin 18.4.1+, Linux)
- Vulkan: Vulkan 1.2 (GCN, Windows), Vulkan 1.3 (GCN, Linux), or none (TeraScale); SPIR-V

History
- Predecessor: Radeon HD 7000 series; Radeon HD 8000 series
- Successor: Radeon 300 series

Support status
- Unsupported

The Radeon 200 series is a series of graphics processors developed by AMD. These GPUs are manufactured on a 28 nm Gate-Last process through TSMC or Common Platform Alliance.

== Release ==
The Rx 200 series was announced on September 25, 2013, at the AMD GPU14 Tech Day event. Non-disclosure agreements were lifted on October 15, except for the R9 290X, and pre-orders opened on October 3.

== Architecture ==
- Graphics Core Next 3 (Volcanic Islands) is found on the R9 285 (Tonga Pro) branded products.
- Graphics Core Next 2 (Sea Islands) is found on R7 260 (Bonaire), R7 260X (Bonaire XTX), R9 290 (Hawaii Pro), R9 290X (Hawaii XT), and R9 295X2 (Vesuvius) branded products.
- Graphics Core Next 1 (Southern Islands) is found on R9 270, 270X, 280, 280X, R7 240, 250, 250X, 265, and R5 240 branded products.
- TeraScale 2 (VLIW5) (Northern Islands or Evergreen) is found on R5 235X and below branded products.
- OpenGL 4.x compliance requires supporting FP64 shaders. These are implemented by emulation on some TeraScale (microarchitecture) GPUs.
- Vulkan 1.0 requires GCN-Architecture. Vulkan 1.1 requires GCN 2 or higher.

=== Multi-monitor support ===
The AMD Eyefinity-branded on-die display controllers were introduced in September 2009 in the Radeon HD 5000 series and have been present in all products since.

=== AMD TrueAudio ===
AMD TrueAudio was introduced with the AMD Radeon RX 200 series, but can only be found on the dies of GCN 2/3 products.

=== Video acceleration ===
AMD's SIP core for video acceleration, Unified Video Decoder and Video Coding Engine, are found on all GPUs and supported by AMD Catalyst and by the free and open-source graphics device driver.

=== Use in cryptocurrency mining ===
During 2014 the Radeon R9 200 series GPUs offered a very competitive price for usage in cryptocurrency mining. This led to limited supply and huge price increases of up to 164% over the MSRP in Q4 of 2013 and Q1 of 2014. Since Q2 of 2018 availability of AMD GPUs as well as pricing has, in most cases, normalized.

=== CrossFire Compatibility ===
Because many of the products in the range are rebadged versions of Radeon HD products, they remain compatible with the original versions when used in CrossFire mode. For example, the Radeon HD 7770 and Radeon R7 250X both use the 'Cape Verde XT' chip so have identical specifications and will work in CrossFire mode. This provides a useful upgrade option for anyone who owns an existing Radeon HD card and has a CrossFire compatible motherboard.

=== Virtual super resolution support ===
Starting with the driver release candidate version v14.501-141112a-177751E, officially named as Catalyst Omega, AMD's driver release introduced VSR on the R9 285 and R9 290 series graphics cards. This feature allows users to run games with higher image quality by rendering frames at above native resolution. Each frame is then downsampled to native resolution. This process is an alternative to supersampling which is not supported by all games. Virtual superb resolution is similar to Dynamic Super Resolution, a feature available on competing nVidia graphics cards, but trades flexibility for increased performance. VSR can run at a resolution upwards of 2048 x 1536 at a 120 Hz refresh rate or 3840 x 2400 at 60 Hz.

=== OpenCL (API) ===
OpenCL accelerates many scientific Software Packages against CPU up to factor 10 or 100 and more. Open CL 1.0 to 1.2 are supported for all Chips with Terascale and GCN Architecture. OpenCL 2.0 is supported with GCN 2nd Gen. (or 1.2) and higher. For OpenCL 2.1 and 2.2 only Driver Updates are necessary with OpenCL 2.0 conformant Cards.

=== Vulkan (API) ===
API Vulkan 1.0 is supported for all GCN architecture cards. Vulkan 1.2 requires GCN 2nd gen or higher with the Adrenalin 20.1 and Linux Mesa 20.0 drivers and up.

== Desktop models ==
=== Radeon R9 295X2 ===
The Radeon R9 295X2 was released on April 21, 2014. It is a dual GPU card. Press samples were shipped in a metal case. It is the first reference card to utilize a closed looped liquid cooler. At 11.5 teraflops of computing power, the R9 295X2 was the most powerful dual GPU consumer-oriented card in the world, until it was succeeded by the Radeon Pro Duo on April 26, 2016, which is essentially a combination of two R9 Fury X (Fiji XT) GPUs on a single card. The R9 295X2 has essentially two R9 290X (Hawaii XT) GPUs each with 4GB GDDR5 VRAM. The R9 295X2 had a launch price of $1499.

=== Radeon R9 290X2 ===
The Radeon R9 290X2 was released on June 24, 2014. It is a dual GPU card. It used air cooling unlike the 295X2. Just like the 295X2, it used 2x Hawaii XT chips to create 11.2 TFLOPS of compute power. It was much less common than the 295X2 and few models were available, including the Powercolor Devil 13 290X2 and the Asus ROG Ares. It had a launch price of $1399.

=== Radeon R9 290X ===
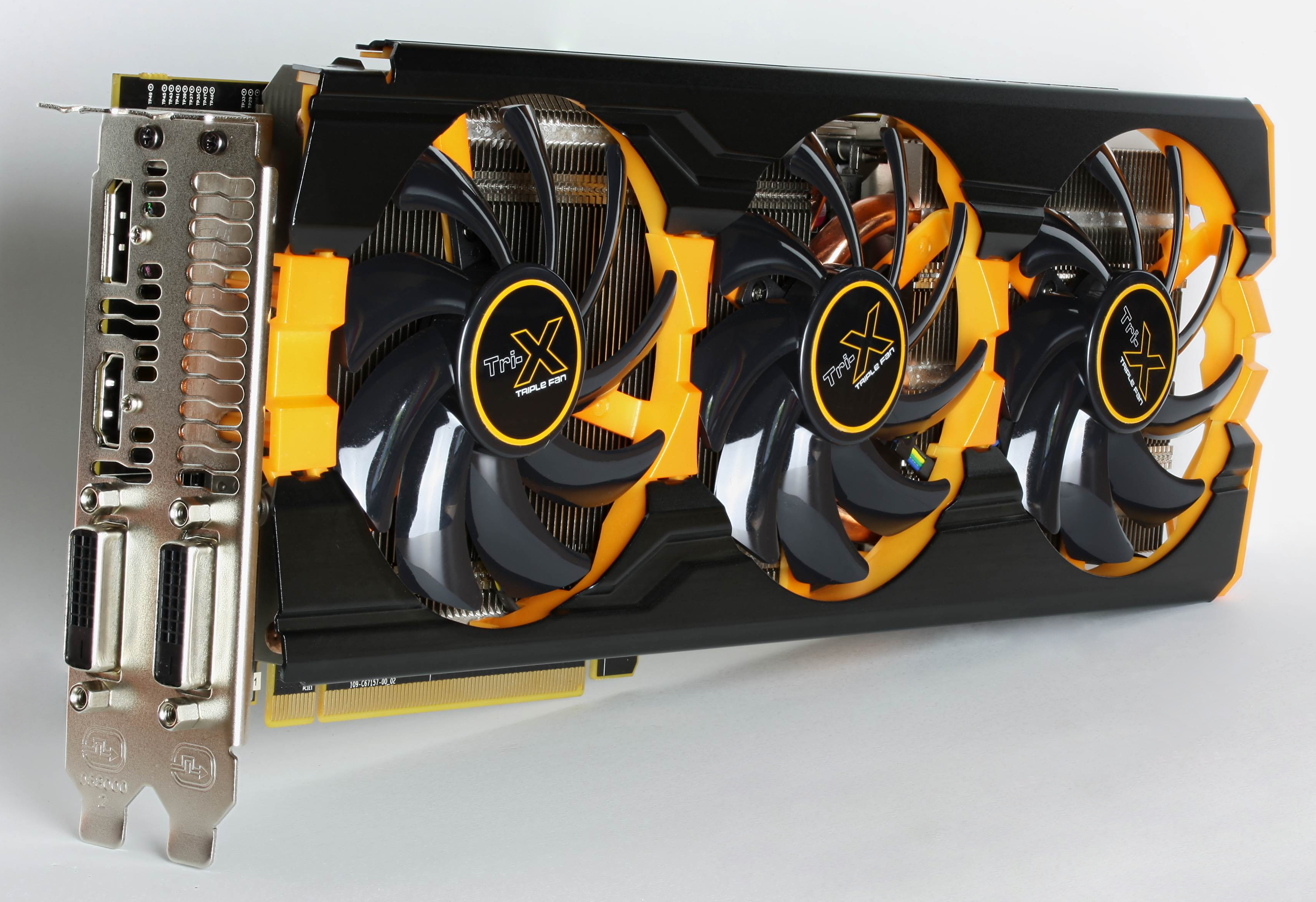
A R9 290X by Sapphire

The Radeon R9 290X, codename "Hawaii XT", was released on October 24, 2013 and features 2816 Stream Processors, 176 TMUs, 64 ROPs, 512-bit wide buses, 44 CUs (compute units) and 8 ACE units. The R9 290X had a launch price of $549.

=== Radeon R9 290 ===
The Radeon R9 290 and R9 290X were announced on September 25, 2013. The R9 290 is based on AMD's Hawaii Pro chip and R9 290X on Hawaii XT. R9 290 and R9 290X will support AMD TrueAudio, Mantle, Direct3D 11.2, and bridge-free Crossfire technology using XDMA. A limited "Battlefield 4 Edition" pre-order bundle of R9 290X that includes Battlefield 4 was available on October 3, 2013, with reported quantity being 8,000. The R9 290 had a launch price of $399.

=== Radeon R9 285 ===
The Radeon R9 285 was announced on August 23, 2014 at AMD's 30 years of graphics celebration and released September 2, 2014. It was the first card to feature AMD's GCN 3 microarchitecture, in the form of a Tonga-series GPU.

=== Radeon R9 280X ===
Radeon R9 280X was announced on September 25, 2013. With a launch price of $299, it is based on the Tahiti XTL chip, being a slightly upgraded, rebranded Radeon HD 7970 GHz Edition.

=== Radeon R9 280 ===
Radeon R9 280 was announced on March 4, 2014. With a launch MSRP set at $279, it is based on a rebranded Radeon HD 7950 with a slightly increased boost clock speed, from 925 MHz to 933 MHz.

=== Radeon R9 270X ===
Radeon R9 270X was announced on September 25, 2013. With a launch price of $199 (2 GB) and $229 (4 GB), it is based on the Curaçao XT chip, which was formerly called Pitcairn. It is speculated to be faster than a Radeon HD 7870 GHz edition. Radeon R9 270 has a launch price of $179.

=== Radeon R7 260X ===
Radeon R7 260X was announced on September 25, 2013. With a launch price of $139, it is based on the Bonaire XTX chip, a faster iteration of Bonaire XT that the Radeon HD 7790 is based on. It will have 2 GB of GDDR5 memory as standard and will also feature TrueAudio, on-chip audio DSP based on Tensilica HiFi EP architecture. The stock card features a boost clock of 1100 MHz. It has 2 GBs of GDDR5 memory with a 6.5 GHz memory clock over a 128-bit Interface. The 260X will draw around 115 W in typical use.

=== Radeon R7 250 ===
Radeon R7 250 was announced on September 25, 2013. It has a launch price of $89. The card is based on the Oland core with 384 GCN cores. On February 10, 2014, AMD announced the R7 250X which is based on the Cape Verde GPU with 640 GCN cores and an MSRP of $99.

== Chipset table ==
=== Desktop models ===
Model (codename)	Release Date & Price	Architecture & Fab	Transistors & Die Size	Core		Fillrate (Note: Boost values (if available) are stated below the base value in italic.) (Note: Texture fillrate is calculated as the number of Texture Mapping Units multiplied by the base (or boost) core clock speed.) (Note: Pixel fillrate is calculated as the number of Render Output Units multiplied by the base (or boost) core clock speed.)		Processing power (Note: Precision performance is calculated from the base (or boost) core clock speed based on a FMA operation.) (GFLOPS)		Memory				TBP	Bus interface
Model (codename)	Release Date & Price	Architecture & Fab	Transistors & Die Size	Config (Note: Unified Shaders : Texture Mapping Units : Render Output Units)	Clock (MHz)	Texture (GT/s)	Pixel (GP/s)	Single	Double	Size (MiB)	Bus type & width	Clock (MT/s)	Band- width (GB/s)	TBP	Bus interface
Radeon R5 220 (Caicos Pro)	December 21, 2013; OEM	Terascale 2 (Note: Lacks hardware video encoder); 40 nm	370×10^{6} 67 mm^{2}	80:8:4	625; 650	5	2.5	200	—N/a	1024	DDR3; 64-bit	1066	8.53	18 W	PCIe 2.1 ×16
Radeon R5 230 (Caicos Pro)	April 3, 2014 ?	Terascale 2; 40 nm	370×10^{6} 67 mm^{2}	160:8:4	625	5	2.5	200	—N/a	1024; 2048	DDR3; 64-bit	1066	8.53	19 W	PCIe 2.1 ×16
Radeon R5 235 (Caicos XT)	December 21, 2013; OEM	Terascale 2; 40 nm	370×10^{6} 67 mm^{2}	160:8:4	775	6.2	3.1	248	—N/a	1024	DDR3; 64-bit	1800	14.4	35 W	PCIe 2.1 ×16
Radeon R5 235X (Caicos XT)	December 21, 2013; OEM	Terascale 2; 40 nm	370×10^{6} 67 mm^{2}	160:8:4	875	7.0	3.5	280	—N/a	1024	DDR3; 64-bit	1800	14.4	18 W	PCIe 2.1 ×16
Radeon R5 240 (Oland)	November 1, 2013; OEM	GCN 1^{st} gen 28 nm	1040×10^{6} 90 mm^{2}	384:24:8	730; 780	14.6	5.84	560.6; 599	29.2	1024; 2048	DDR3; GDDR3; 64-bit	1800; 2000	14.4; 16.0	30 W	PCIe 3.0 ×8
Radeon R7 240 (Oland Pro)	August 8, 2013; US $69	GCN 1^{st} gen 28 nm	1040×10^{6} 90 mm^{2}	320:20:8	730; 780	14.6	5.84	467.2; 499.2	29.2	2048; 4096	DDR3; GDDR5; 128-bit	1800; 4500	28.8; 72	30 W, <45 W (4 GB)	PCIe 3.0 ×8
Radeon R7 250 (Oland XT)	August 8, 2013; US $89	GCN 1^{st} gen 28 nm	1040×10^{6} 90 mm^{2}	384:24:8	1000 (1050)	24	8	768; 806.4	48	1024; 2048	DDR3; GDDR5; 128-bit	1800; 4600	28.8; 73.6	75 W	PCIe 3.0 ×8
Radeon R7 250E (Cape Verde Pro)	December 21, 2013; US $109	GCN 1^{st} gen 28 nm	1500×10^{6} 123 mm^{2}	512:32:16	800	25.6	12.8	819.2	51.2	1024; 2048	GDDR5; 128-bit	4500	72	55 W	PCIe 3.0 ×16
Radeon R7 250X (Cape Verde XT)	February 10, 2014; US $99	GCN 1^{st} gen 28 nm	1500×10^{6} 123 mm^{2}	640:40:16	1000	40	16	1280	80	1024; 2048	GDDR5; 128-bit	4500	72	95 W	PCIe 3.0 ×16
Radeon R7 260 (Bonaire)	December 17, 2013; US $109	GCN 2^{nd} gen 28 nm	2080×10^{6} 160 mm^{2}	768:48:16	1000	48	16	1536	96	1024	GDDR5; 128-bit	6000	96	95 W	PCIe 3.0 ×16
Radeon R7 260X (Bonaire XTX)	August 8, 2013; US $139	GCN 2^{nd} gen 28 nm	2080×10^{6} 160 mm^{2}	896:56:16	1100	61.6	17.6	1971.2	123.2	1024; 2048	GDDR5; 128-bit	6500	104	115 W	PCIe 3.0 ×16
Radeon R7 265 (Pitcairn Pro)	February 13, 2014; US $149	GCN 1^{st} gen 28 nm	2800×10^{6} 212 mm^{2}	1024:64:32	900; 925	57.6	28.8	1843.2	115.2	2048	GDDR5; 256-bit	5600	179.2	150 W	PCIe 3.0 ×16
Radeon R9 270 (Pitcairn XT)	November 13, 2013; US $179	GCN 1^{st} gen 28 nm	2800×10^{6} 212 mm^{2}	1280:80:32	900; 925	72	28.8	2304; 2368	144; 148	2048	GDDR5; 256-bit	5600	179.2	150 W	PCIe 3.0 ×16
Radeon R9 270X (Pitcairn XT)	August 8, 2013; US $199	GCN 1^{st} gen 28 nm	2800×10^{6} 212 mm^{2}	1280:80:32	1000; 1050	80	32	2560; 2688	160; 168	2048; 4096	GDDR5; 256-bit	5600	179.2	180 W	PCIe 3.0 ×16
Radeon R9 280 (Tahiti Pro)	March 4, 2014; US $249	GCN 1^{st} gen 28 nm	4313×10^{6} 352 mm^{2}	1792:112:32	827; 933	92.6	26.5	2964; 3343.9	741; 836	3072	GDDR5; 384-bit	5000	240	250 W	PCIe 3.0 ×16
Radeon R9 280X (Tahiti XTL)	August 8, 2013; US $299	GCN 1^{st} gen 28 nm	4313×10^{6} 352 mm^{2}	2048:128:32	850; 1000	109–128	27.2–32	3481.6; 4096	870.4; 1024	3072	GDDR5; 384-bit	6000	288	250 W	PCIe 3.0 ×16
Radeon R9 285 (Tonga Pro)	September 2, 2014; US $249	GCN 3^{rd} gen 28 nm	5000×10^{6} 359 mm^{2}	1792:112:32	918	102.8	29.4	3290	206.6	2048	GDDR5; 256-bit	5500	176 (Note: The R9 285 utilizes loss-less colour compression which can increase effective memory performance (relative to GCN 1^{st} gen and 2^{nd} gen cards) in certain situations.)	190 W	PCIe 3.0 ×16
Radeon R9 285X (Tonga XT)	Unreleased	GCN 3^{rd} gen 28 nm	5000×10^{6} 359 mm^{2}	2048:128:32	1002	128.3	32.1	4104	256.5	3072	GDDR5; 384-bit	5500	264	200 W	PCIe 3.0 ×16
Radeon R9 290 (Hawaii Pro)	November 5, 2013; US $399	GCN 2^{nd} gen 28 nm	6200×10^{6} 438 mm^{2}	2560:160:64	up to 947 (Note: Base clock of R9 290 and R9 290X will maintain at 947 MHz and 1000 MHz before reaching 95 °C, respectively.)	151.52	60.608	4848.6	606.1	4096	GDDR5; 512-bit	5000	320	250 W	PCIe 3.0 ×16
Radeon R9 290X (Hawaii XT)	October 24, 2013; November 6, 2014; US $549	GCN 2^{nd} gen 28 nm	6200×10^{6} 438 mm^{2}	2816:176:64	1000	176	64	5632	704	4096; 8192	GDDR5; 512-bit	5000	320	250 W	PCIe 3.0 ×16
Radeon R9 295X2 (Vesuvius)	April 8, 2014; US $1499	GCN 2^{nd} gen 28 nm	2× 6200×10^{6} 2× 438 mm^{2}	2× 2816:176:64	1018	358.33	130.3	11466.75	1433.34	2× 4096	GDDR5; 512-bit	5000	2× 320	500 W	PCIe 3.0 ×16
Model (codename)	Release Date & Price	Architecture & Fab	Transistors & Die Size	Config	Clock (MHz)	Texture (GT/s)	Pixel (GP/s)	Single	Double	Size (MiB)	Bus type & width	Clock (MT/s)	Band- width (GB/s)	TBP	Bus interface
Model (codename)	Release Date & Price	Architecture & Fab	Transistors & Die Size	Core		Fillrate		Processing power (GFLOPS)		Memory				TBP	Bus interface

=== Mobile models ===
Model (Codename)	Launch	Architecture (Fab)	Core		Fillrate (Note: Boost values (if available) are stated below the base value in italic.) (Note: Texture fillrate is calculated as the number of Texture Mapping Units multiplied by the base (or boost) core clock speed.) (Note: Pixel fillrate is calculated as the number of Render Output Units multiplied by the base (or boost) core clock speed.)		Processing power (Note: Precision performance is calculated from the base (or boost) core clock speed based on a FMA operation.) (GFLOPS)	Memory				TDP
Model (Codename)	Launch	Architecture (Fab)	Config (Note: Unified Shaders : Texture Mapping Units : Render Output Units)	Clock (MHz)	Texture (GT/s)	Pixel (GP/s)	Processing power (GFLOPS)	Size (GiB)	Bus type & width	Clock (MT/s)	Band- width (GB/s)	TDP
Radeon R5 M230 (Jet Pro)	January 2014	GCN 1^{st} gen (28 nm)	320:20:8:5	780; 855	3.4	17.1	547	2; 4	DDR3; 64-bit	2000	16	Unknown
Radeon R5 M255 (Topaz Pro)	October 2014	GCN 3^{rd} gen (28 nm)	320:20:8:5	925; 940	7.5	18.8	601	2; 4	DDR3; 64-bit	1800; 2000	16	Unknown
Radeon R7 M260 (Topaz XT)	June 2014	GCN 3^{rd} gen (28 nm)	384:24:8:6	620; 980	5.7; 7.8	17.2; 23.5	549.1; 752.6	2; 4	DDR3; 128-bit	1800; 2000	14.4; 16	Unknown
Radeon R7 M260X (Opal Pro)	December 2015	GCN 1^{st} gen (28 nm)	384:24:8:6	620; 715	5.7	17.2	549	2; 4	GDDR5; 128-bit	4000	64	Unknown
Radeon R7 M265 (Opal XT)	May 2014	GCN 1^{st} gen (28 nm)	384:24:8:6	725; 825	6.6	19.8	633.6	2; 4	DDR3; 64-bit	1800; 2000	14.4; 16	Unknown
Radeon R9 M265X (Venus Pro)	May 2014	GCN 1^{st} gen (28 nm)	640:40:16:10	575; 625	10	25	800	2; 4	GDDR5; 128-bit	4500	72	Unknown
Radeon R9 M270X (Venus XT)	May 2014	GCN 1^{st} gen (28 nm)	640:40:16:10	725; 775	12.4	31	992	2; 4	GDDR5; 128-bit	4500	72	Unknown
Radeon R9 M275X (Venus XTX)	May 2014	GCN 1^{st} gen (28 nm)	640:40:16:10	900; 925	14.8	37	1184	2; 4	GDDR5; 128-bit	4500	72	50 W
Radeon R9 M280X (Saturn XT)	February 2015	GCN 2^{nd} gen (28 nm)	896:56:16:14	1000; 1100	17.6	61.6	1792	2; 4	GDDR5; 128-bit	6000	96	~75 W
Radeon R9 M290X (Neptune XT)	May 2014	GCN 1^{st} gen (28 nm)	1280:80:32:20	850; 900	28.8	72	2176; 2304	4	GDDR5; 256-bit	4800	153.6	100 W
Radeon R9 M295X (Amethyst XT)	November 2014	GCN 3^{rd} gen (28 nm)	2048:128:32:32	750; 800	25.6	102.4	3276.8	4	GDDR5; 256-bit	5500	176	250 W

== Radeon Feature Matrix ==
The following table shows features of AMD/ATI's GPUs (see also: List of AMD graphics processing units).

Name of GPU series	Wonder	Mach	3D Rage	Rage Pro	Rage 128	R100	R200	R300	R400	R500	R600	RV670	R700	Evergreen	Northern Islands		Southern Islands	Sea Islands	Volcanic Islands	Arctic Islands/Polaris	Vega	Navi 1x	Navi 2x	Navi 3x	Navi 4x
Released	1986	1991	Apr; 1996	Mar; 1997	Aug; 1998	Apr; 2000	Aug; 2001	Sep; 2002	May; 2004	Oct; 2005	May; 2007	Nov; 2007	Jun; 2008	Sep; 2009	Oct; 2010	Dec; 2010	Jan; 2012	Sep; 2013	Jun; 2015	Jun 2016, Apr 2017, Aug 2019	Jun 2017, Feb 2019	Jul; 2019	Nov; 2020	Dec; 2022	Feb; 2025
Marketing Name	Wonder	Mach	3D; Rage	Rage; Pro	Rage; 128	Radeon; 7000	Radeon; 8000	Radeon; 9000	Radeon; X700/X800	Radeon; X1000	Radeon; HD 2000	Radeon; HD 3000	Radeon; HD 4000	Radeon; HD 5000	Radeon; HD 6000		Radeon; HD 7000	Radeon; 200	Radeon; 300	Radeon; 400/500/600	Radeon; RX Vega, Radeon VII	Radeon; RX 5000	Radeon; RX 6000	Radeon; RX 7000	Radeon; RX 9000
AMD support	Ended																			Current					
Kind	2D		3D																						
Instruction set architecture	Not publicly known									Multiple (Note: R500 has two instruction sets. Vertex shader cores: "PVS instruction set". Pixel shader cores: "US instruction set".)	TeraScale instruction set						GCN instruction set					RDNA instruction set			
Microarchitecture	Not publicly known					GFX1		GFX2			TeraScale 1 (VLIW5) (GFX3)			TeraScale 2 (VLIW5) (GFX4)	TeraScale 2 (VLIW5) up to 68xx (GFX4)	TeraScale 3 (VLIW4) in 69xx (GFX5)	GCN 1st gen (GFX6)	GCN 2nd gen (GFX7)	GCN 3rd gen (GFX8)	GCN 4th gen (GFX8)	GCN 5th gen (GFX9)	RDNA (GFX10.1)	RDNA 2 (GFX10.3)	RDNA 3 (GFX11)	RDNA 4 (GFX12)
Type	Fixed pipeline (Note: The Radeon R100 Series has programmable pixel shaders, but do not fully comply with DirectX 8 or Pixel Shader 1.0. See article on R100's pixel shaders.)						Programmable pixel & vertex pipelines				Unified shader model														
Direct3D	—N/a		5.0	6.0		7.0	8.1	9.0; 11 (9_2)	9.0b 11 (9_2)	9.0c 11 (9_3)	10.0; 11 (10_0)	10.1; 11 (10_1)		11 (11_0)			11 (11_1); 12 (11_1)	11 (12_0); 12 (12_0)			11 (12_1); 12 (12_1)		11 (12_1); 12 (12_2)		
Shader model	—N/a						1.4	2.0+	2.0b	3.0	4.0	4.1		5.0			5.1	5.1; 6.5			6.7				6.8
OpenGL	—N/a			1.1	1.2	1.3		1.5 (Note: R300, R400 and R500 based cards do not fully comply with OpenGL 2+ as the hardware does not support all types of non-power of two (NPOT) textures.)			3.3			4.5 (Windows), 4.6 (Linux Mesa 25.2+)			4.6 (Note: OpenGL 4+ compliance requires supporting FP64 shaders and these are emulated on some TeraScale chips using 32-bit hardware.)								
Vulkan	—N/a															1.1 (Note: Vulkan support is theoretically possible but has not been implemented in a stable driver.)	1.3 (Note: Vulkan support in Linux relies on the AMDgpu kernel driver, the radeon driver does not support Vulkan.)		1.4						
OpenCL	—N/a										Close to Metal		1.1 (not supported by Mesa)	1.2+ (on Linux: 1.1+ (no Image support on Clover, with Rusticl) with Mesa, 1.2+ on GCN 1.Gen)				2.0+ (Adrenalin driver on Win 7+) (on Linux ROCm, Mesa 1.2+ (no support in Clover, only Rusticl, Mesa, 2.0+ and 3.0 with AMD drivers or AMD ROCm), 5th gen: 2.2 win 10+ and Linux RocM 5.0+				2.2+ and 3.0 Windows 8.1+ and Linux ROCm 5.0+ (Mesa Rusticl 1.2+ and 3.0 (2.1+ and 2.2+))			
HSA / ROCm	—N/a																Yes					?			
Video decoding ASIC	—N/a										Avivo/UVD	UVD+	UVD 2	UVD 2.2	UVD 3		UVD 4	UVD 4.2	UVD 5.0 or 6.0	UVD 6.3	UVD 7 (Note: The UVD and VCE were replaced by the Video Core Next (VCN) ASIC in the Raven Ridge APU implementation of Vega.)	VCN 2.0	VCN 3.0	VCN 4.0	VCN 5.0
Video encoding ASIC	—N/a																VCE 1.0	VCE 2.0	VCE 3.0 or 3.1	VCE 3.4	VCE 4.0	VCN 2.0	VCN 3.0	VCN 4.0	VCN 5.0
Fluid Motion (Note: Video processing for video frame rate interpolation technique. In Windows it works as a DirectShow filter in your player. In Linux, there is no support on the part of drivers and / or community.)	No																	Yes				No		?	
Power saving	?										PowerPlay				PowerTune		PowerTune & ZeroCore Power					?			
TrueAudio	—N/a																	Via dedicated DSP		Via shaders					
FreeSync	—N/a																	1; 2							
HDCP (Note: To play protected video content, it also requires card, operating system, driver, and application support. A compatible HDCP display is also needed for this. HDCP is mandatory for the output of certain audio formats, placing additional constraints on the multimedia setup.)	—N/a										?							1.4		2.2		2.3			
PlayReady	—N/a																			3.0	No	3.0			
Supported displays (Note: More displays may be supported with native DisplayPort connections, or splitting the maximum resolution between multiple monitors with active converters.)						1–2	2							2–6								?			4
Max. resolution	?													2–6 × 2560×1600			2–6 × 4096×2160 @ 30 Hz			2–6 × 5120×2880 @ 60 Hz	3 × 7680×4320 @ 60 Hz	7680×4320 @ 60 Hz PowerColor		7680x4320 @165 Hz	7680x4320
/drm/radeon (Note: DRM (Direct Rendering Manager) is a component of the Linux kernel. AMDgpu is the Linux kernel module. Support in this table refers to the most current version.)						Yes													—N/a						
/drm/amdgpu	—N/a																Yes Kernel 6.19+		Yes						

== Graphics device drivers ==
=== AMD's proprietary graphics device driver "Catalyst" ===
AMD Catalyst is being developed for Microsoft Windows and Linux. As of July 2014, other operating system are not officially supported. This may be different for the AMD FirePro brand, which is based on identical hardware but features OpenGL-certified graphics device drivers.

AMD Catalyst supports of course all features advertised for the Radeon brand.

=== Free and open-source graphics device driver "Radeon" ===
The free and open-source drivers are primarily developed on Linux and for Linux, but have been ported to other operating systems as well. Each driver is composed out of five parts:

1. Linux kernel component DRM
2. Linux kernel component KMS driver: basically the device driver for the display controller
3. user-space component libDRM
4. user-space component in Mesa 3D;
5. a special and distinct 2D graphics device driver for X.Org Server, which if finally about to be replaced by Glamor

The free and open-source "Radeon" graphics driver supports most of the features implemented into the Radeon line of GPUs. Unlike the nouveau project for Nvidia graphics cards, the open-source "Radeon" drivers are not reverse engineered, but based on documentation released by AMD.

== See also ==
- AMD FirePro
- AMD FireMV
- AMD FireStream
- List of AMD graphics processing units
