= Radeon 400 series =

Series of graphics cards by AMD

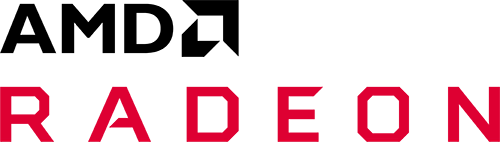
- Release date: June 29, 2016; 10 years ago
- Codename: Polaris
- Architecture: GCN 1st gen GCN 2nd gen GCN 4th gen
- Transistors: 950M (Olan) 28 nm; 1,500M (Cape Verde) 28 nm; 2,080M (Bonaire) 28 nm; 3,000M (Baffin) 14 nm; 5,700M (Ellesmere) 14 nm
- Fabrication process: Samsung/GloFo 14 nm (FinFET); Some in 28 nm (CMOS)

Cards
- Entry-level: Radeon R5 420; Radeon R5 430; Radeon R5 435; Radeon R7 430; Radeon R7 435
- Mid-range: Radeon R7 450; Radeon RX 455; Radeon RX 460; Radeon RX 470D; Radeon RX 470
- High-end: Radeon RX 480

API support
- Direct3D: Direct3D 12.0 (feature level 12_0); Shader Model 6.7 (GCN 4th gen) or Shader Model 6.5
- OpenCL: OpenCL 2.1
- OpenGL: OpenGL 4.6
- Vulkan: Vulkan 1.2 (GCN 1st gen and GCN 2nd gen for Windows); Vulkan 1.3 (GCN 4th gen for Windows, GCN 1st gen or newer for Linux); SPIR-V

History
- Predecessor: Radeon 300 series
- Successor: Radeon 500 series

Support status
- Unsupported

The Radeon 400 series is a series of graphics processors (GPUs) developed by AMD. It introduced two new GPU chips, codenamed the Polaris 10 and 11, based on the GCN 4 microarchitecture, and manufactured with GlobalFoundries' 14 nm process; it also includes several rebranded, older products.

== Features ==
The 400 series introduced the RX prefix, applied to cards capable of 1.5 TFlops of single-precision math and more than 80 GB/s of effective memory bandwidth (after accounting for memory compression); cards that don't meet these specifications have the prefix omitted.

Polaris-based GPUs feature support for new hardware schedulers, a new primitive discard accelerator, a new display controller, and an updated UVD that can decode HEVC at 4K resolutions at 60 frames per second with 10 bits per color channel. On 8 December 2016, AMD released Crimson ReLive drivers (Version 16.12.1), which make GCN-GPUs support VP9 decode acceleration up to 4K@60 Hz and twinned with support for Dolby Vision and HDR10.

== Chips ==
=== Polaris ===
Polaris 10 features 2304 stream processors across 36 Compute Units (CUs), and supports up to 8GB of GDDR5 memory on a 256-bit memory interface. The GPU replaces the mid-range Tonga segment of the Radeon M300 line. According to AMD, their prime target with the design of Polaris was energy efficiency: Polaris 10 was initially planned to be a mid-range chip, to be featured in the RX 480, with a TDP of around 110-135W compared to its predecessor R9 380's 190W TDP. Despite this, the Polaris 10 chip is anticipated to run the latest DirectX 12 games "at a resolution of 1440p with a stable 60 frames per second."

Polaris 11, on the other hand, is to succeed the "Curacao" GPU which powers various low-to-mid-range cards. It features 1024 stream processors over 16 CUs, coupled with up to 4GB of GDDR5 memory on a 128 bit memory interface. Polaris 11 has a TDP of 75W.

== Reviews ==
Many reviewers praised the performance of the RX 480 8GB when evaluated in light of its $239 release price. The Tech Report stated that the RX 480 is the fastest card for the $200 segment at the time of its launch. HardOCP gave this card an Editor's Choice Silver award. PC Perspective gave it the PC Perspective Gold Award.

=== RX 480 reference card PCI Express power limit violations ===
Some reviewers discovered that the AMD Radeon RX 480 violates the PCI Express power draw specifications, which allows a maximum of 75 watts (66 watts on its 12v pins) being drawn from the motherboard's PCI Express slot. Chris Angelini of Tom's Hardware noticed that in a stress test it can draw up to an average of 90 watts from the slot and 86 watts in a typical gaming load. The peak usage can be up to 162 watts and 300 watts altogether with the power supply in a gaming load. TechPowerUp corroborated these results by noting it can also draw up to 166 watts from the power supply, past the limit of 75 watts for a 6-pin PCI Express power connector. Ryan Shrout of PC Perspective did a follow-up test after other reports and found out his review sample takes 80-84 watts from the motherboard at stock speed, and that the other PCI Express slots' 12 volt power supply pins were supplying only 11.5 volts during load on his Asus ROG Rampage V Extreme motherboard. He was not concerned about the voltage droop due to the specification's 8% voltage tolerance, but did note of possible problems in systems where multiple overclocked RX 480 cards are running in quad CrossFire, or in motherboards that are not designed to withstand high currents, such as budget and older models.

AMD has released a driver that reprograms the voltage regulator module to draw less power from the motherboard, allowing the power draw from the motherboard to pass the PCI Express specification. While this worsens the overage on the 6-pin power connector, that violation is not much of a concern because these connectors have a greater safety margin in their power rating. The amount of power drawn from on the connector is dependent on a newly introduced "compatibility mode" in the driver. When on, compatibility mode reduces the total power consumption of the card, allowing both power sources to operate closer to their ratings. Standard mode yields essentially unchanged performance, while compatibility mode results in performance drops within the error of benchmarks. Some RX 480 cards designed by AMD's partners include an 8-pin power connector which can provide more power than the stock design.

== Chipset table ==
- Supported display standards are: DisplayPort 1.4 HBR, HDMI 2.0b, HDR10 color
- Dual-Link DVI-D and DVI-I at resolutions up to 4096×2304 are also supported, despite ports not being present on the reference cards.

=== Desktop ===
Model (Codename)	Release Date & Price	Architecture & Fab	Transistors & Die Size	Core		Fillrate (Note: Boost values (if available) are stated below the base value in italic.) (Note: Texture fillrate is calculated as the number of Texture Mapping Units multiplied by the base (or boost) core clock speed.) (Note: Pixel fillrate is calculated as the number of Render Output Units multiplied by the base (or boost) core clock speed.)		Processing power (Note: Precision performance is calculated from the base (or boost) core clock speed based on a FMA operation.) (GFLOPS)		Memory				TBP	Bus interface
Model (Codename)	Release Date & Price	Architecture & Fab	Transistors & Die Size	Config (Note: Unified Shaders : Texture Mapping Units : Render Output Units and Compute Units (CU))	Clock (MHz)	Texture (GT/s)	Pixel (GP/s)	Single	Double	Size (GiB)	Bus type & width	Clock (MT/s)	Band- width (GB/s)	TBP	Bus interface
Radeon R5 430 (Oland Pro)	June 30, 2016; OEM	GCN 1^{st} gen 28 nm	1040×10^{6} 90 mm^{2}	384:24:8; 6 CU	730; 780	17.52; 18.72	5.84; 6.24	560; 599	37.4; 40	1; 2	DDR3; GDDR5; 64-bit	1800; 4500	28.8; 36	50 W	PCIe 3.0 ×8
Radeon R5 435 (Oland)	June 30, 2016; OEM	GCN 1^{st} gen 28 nm	1040×10^{6} 90 mm^{2}	320:20:8; 5 CU	1030	20.6	8.24	659	41.2	2	DDR3; 64-bit	2000	16	50 W	PCIe 3.0 ×8
Radeon R7 430 (Oland Pro)	June 30, 2016; OEM	GCN 1^{st} gen 28 nm	1040×10^{6} 90 mm^{2}	384:24:8; 6 CU	730; 780	17.52; 18.72	5.84; 6.24	560; 599	37.4; 40	1; 2; 4	DDR3; GDDR5; 128-bit	1800; 4500	28.8; 72	50 W	PCIe 3.0 ×8
Radeon R7 435 (Oland)	June 30, 2016; OEM	GCN 1^{st} gen 28 nm	1040×10^{6} 90 mm^{2}	320:20:8; 5 CU	920	18.4	7.36	589	36.8	2	DDR3; 64-bit	2000	16	50 W	PCIe 3.0 ×8
Radeon R7 450 (Cape Verde Pro)	June 30, 2016; OEM	GCN 1^{st} gen 28 nm	1500×10^{6} 123 mm^{2}	512:32:16; 8 CU	1050	33.6	16.8	1075	65.2	2; 4	GDDR5; 128-bit	4500	72	65 W	PCIe 3.0 ×16
Radeon RX 455 (Bonaire Pro)	June 30, 2016; OEM	GCN 2^{nd} gen 28 nm	2080×10^{6} 160 mm^{2}	768:48:16; 12 CU	1050	50.4	16.8	1613	100.8	2	GDDR5; 128-bit	6500	104	100 W	PCIe 3.0 ×16
Radeon RX 460 (Baffin)	August 8, 2016 $109 USD(2 GB) $139 USD(4 GB)	GCN 4^{th} gen GloFo; 14LPP (Note: GlobalFoundries' 14 nm 14LPP FinFET process is second-sourced from Samsung Electronics.)	3000×10^{6} 123 mm^{2}	896:56:16; 14 CU	1090; 1200	61; 67.2	17.4; 19.2	1953; 2150	122; 132	2; 4	GDDR5; 128-bit	7000	112	<75 W	PCIe 3.0 ×8
Radeon RX 470D (Ellesmere)	October 21, 2016; CNY ¥1299 (China Only)	GCN 4^{th} gen GloFo; 14LPP	5700×10^{6} 232 mm^{2}	1792:112:32; 28 CU	926; 1206	103.7; 135.1	29.6; 38.6	3319; 4322	207; 270	4	GDDR5; 256-bit	7000	224	120 W	PCIe 3.0 ×16
Radeon RX 470 (Ellesmere Pro)	August 4, 2016 $179 USD	GCN 4^{th} gen GloFo; 14LPP	5700×10^{6} 232 mm^{2}	2048:128:32; 32 CU	926; 1206	118.5; 154.4	29.6; 38.6	3793; 4940	237; 309	4; 8	GDDR5; 256-bit	6600	211	120 W	PCIe 3.0 ×16
Radeon RX 480 (Ellesmere XT)	June 29, 2016 $199 USD (4 GB) $239 USD (8 GB)	GCN 4^{th} gen GloFo; 14LPP	5700×10^{6} 232 mm^{2}	2304:144:32; 36 CU	1120; 1266	161.3; 182.3	35.8; 40.5	5161; 5834	323; 365	4; 8	GDDR5; 256-bit	7000; 8000	224; 256	150 W	PCIe 3.0 ×16

=== Mobile ===
Model (Codename)	Launch	Architecture & Fab	Core		Fillrate (Note: Boost values (if available) are stated below the base value in italic.) (Note: Texture fillrate is calculated as the number of Texture Mapping Units multiplied by the base (or boost) core clock speed.) (Note: Pixel fillrate is calculated as the number of Render Output Units multiplied by the base (or boost) core clock speed.)		Processing power (Note: Precision performance is calculated from the base (or boost) core clock speed based on a FMA operation.) (GFLOPS)	Memory				TDP
Model (Codename)	Launch	Architecture & Fab	Config (Note: Unified Shaders : Texture Mapping Units : Render Output Units)	Clock (MHz)	Texture (GT/s)	Pixel (GP/s)	Processing power (GFLOPS)	Bus type & width	Size (GiB)	Clock (MHz)	Band- width (GB/s)	TDP
Radeon R5 M420 (Jet Pro)	15 May 2016	GCN 1^{st} gen 28 nm	320:20:8	780; 855	15.6; 17.1	6.24; 6.84	499; 547	DDR3; 64-bit	2	1000	16.0	~20 W
Radeon R5 M430 (Exo Pro)	15 May 2016	GCN 1^{st} gen 28 nm	320:20:8	1030 ?	20.6	8.2	659.2; 659.2	DDR3; 64-bit	2	1000	14.4	18 W
Radeon R7 M435 (Jet Pro)	15 May 2016	GCN 1^{st} gen 28 nm	320:20:8	780; 855	15.6; 17.1	6.24; 6.84	499; 547	GDDR5; 64-bit	4	1000	32	~20 W
Radeon R7 M440 (Meso Pro)	15 May 2016	GCN 1^{st} gen 28 nm	320:20:8	1021 ?	20.4	8.17	653; 653	DDR3; 64-bit	4	1000	16	~20 W
Radeon R7 M445 (Meso Pro)	14 May 2016	GCN 1^{st} gen 28 nm	320:20:8	780; 920	15.6; 18.4	6.24; 7.36	499; 589	GDDR5; 64-bit	4	1000	32	~20 W
Radeon R7 M460 (Meso XT)	April 2016	GCN 1^{st} gen 28 nm	384:24:8	1100; 1125	26.4; 27.0	8.8; 9.00	844; 864	DDR3; 64-bit	2	900	14.4	Unknown
Radeon RX 460 (Baffin)	August 2016	GCN 4^{th} gen 14 nm	896:56:16	Unknown	Unknown	Unknown	Unknown	GDDR5; 128-bit	2	1750	112	35 W?
Radeon R7 M465 (Litho XT)	May 2016	GCN 1^{st} gen 28 nm	384:24:8	825; 960	19.8; 23.0	6.6; 7.68	634; 737	GDDR5; 128-bit	4	1150	32	Unknown
Radeon R7 M465X (Tropo XT)	May 2016	GCN 1^{st} gen 28 nm	512:32:16	900; 925	28.8; 29.6	14.4; 14.80	921; 947	GDDR5; 128-bit	4	1125	72	Unknown
Radeon R9 M470 (Strato Pro)	May 2016	GCN 2^{nd} gen 28 nm	768:48:16	900; 1000	43.2; 48.0	14.4; 16.00	1382; 1536	GDDR5; 128-bit	4	1500	96	~75 W
Radeon R9 M470X (Strato XT)	May 2016	GCN 2^{nd} gen 28 nm	896:56:16	1000; 1100	56.0; 61.6	16.00; 17.60	1792; 1971	GDDR5; 128-bit	4	1500	96	~75 W
Radeon RX 470 (Ellesmere Pro)	August 2016	GCN 4^{th} gen 14 nm	2048:128:32	Unknown	Unknown	Unknown	Unknown	GDDR5; 256-bit	4	1650	211	85 W?
Radeon RX 480M (Baffin)	TBA	GCN 4^{th} gen 14 nm	1024:xx:xx	Unknown	Unknown	Unknown	Unknown	GDDR5; 128-bit	Unknown	Unknown	Unknown	35 W
Radeon R9 M485X (Antigua XT)	May 2016	GCN 3^{rd} gen 28 nm	2048:128:32	723	92.5	23.14	2961	GDDR5; 256-bit	8	1250	160	~100 W

== Radeon feature matrix ==
The following table shows features of AMD/ATI's GPUs (see also: List of AMD graphics processing units).

Name of GPU series	Wonder	Mach	3D Rage	Rage Pro	Rage 128	R100	R200	R300	R400	R500	R600	RV670	R700	Evergreen	Northern Islands		Southern Islands	Sea Islands	Volcanic Islands	Arctic Islands/Polaris	Vega	Navi 1x	Navi 2x	Navi 3x	Navi 4x
Released	1986	1991	Apr; 1996	Mar; 1997	Aug; 1998	Apr; 2000	Aug; 2001	Sep; 2002	May; 2004	Oct; 2005	May; 2007	Nov; 2007	Jun; 2008	Sep; 2009	Oct; 2010	Dec; 2010	Jan; 2012	Sep; 2013	Jun; 2015	Jun 2016, Apr 2017, Aug 2019	Jun 2017, Feb 2019	Jul; 2019	Nov; 2020	Dec; 2022	Feb; 2025
Marketing Name	Wonder	Mach	3D; Rage	Rage; Pro	Rage; 128	Radeon; 7000	Radeon; 8000	Radeon; 9000	Radeon; X700/X800	Radeon; X1000	Radeon; HD 2000	Radeon; HD 3000	Radeon; HD 4000	Radeon; HD 5000	Radeon; HD 6000		Radeon; HD 7000	Radeon; 200	Radeon; 300	Radeon; 400/500/600	Radeon; RX Vega, Radeon VII	Radeon; RX 5000	Radeon; RX 6000	Radeon; RX 7000	Radeon; RX 9000
AMD support	Ended																			Current					
Kind	2D		3D																						
Instruction set architecture	Not publicly known									Multiple (Note: R500 has two instruction sets. Vertex shader cores: "PVS instruction set". Pixel shader cores: "US instruction set".)	TeraScale instruction set						GCN instruction set					RDNA instruction set			
Microarchitecture	Not publicly known					GFX1		GFX2			TeraScale 1 (VLIW5) (GFX3)			TeraScale 2 (VLIW5) (GFX4)	TeraScale 2 (VLIW5) up to 68xx (GFX4)	TeraScale 3 (VLIW4) in 69xx (GFX5)	GCN 1st gen (GFX6)	GCN 2nd gen (GFX7)	GCN 3rd gen (GFX8)	GCN 4th gen (GFX8)	GCN 5th gen (GFX9)	RDNA (GFX10.1)	RDNA 2 (GFX10.3)	RDNA 3 (GFX11)	RDNA 4 (GFX12)
Type	Fixed pipeline (Note: The Radeon R100 Series has programmable pixel shaders, but do not fully comply with DirectX 8 or Pixel Shader 1.0. See article on R100's pixel shaders.)						Programmable pixel & vertex pipelines				Unified shader model														
Direct3D	—N/a		5.0	6.0		7.0	8.1	9.0; 11 (9_2)	9.0b 11 (9_2)	9.0c 11 (9_3)	10.0; 11 (10_0)	10.1; 11 (10_1)		11 (11_0)			11 (11_1); 12 (11_1)	11 (12_0); 12 (12_0)			11 (12_1); 12 (12_1)		11 (12_1); 12 (12_2)		
Shader model	—N/a						1.4	2.0+	2.0b	3.0	4.0	4.1		5.0			5.1	5.1; 6.5			6.7				6.8
OpenGL	—N/a			1.1	1.2	1.3		1.5 (Note: R300, R400 and R500 based cards do not fully comply with OpenGL 2+ as the hardware does not support all types of non-power of two (NPOT) textures.)			3.3			4.5 (Windows), 4.6 (Linux Mesa 25.2+)			4.6 (Note: OpenGL 4+ compliance requires supporting FP64 shaders and these are emulated on some TeraScale chips using 32-bit hardware.)								
Vulkan	—N/a															1.1 (Note: Vulkan support is theoretically possible but has not been implemented in a stable driver.)	1.3 (Note: Vulkan support in Linux relies on the AMDgpu kernel driver, the radeon driver does not support Vulkan.)		1.4						
OpenCL	—N/a										Close to Metal		1.1 (not supported by Mesa)	1.2+ (on Linux: 1.1+ (no Image support on Clover, with Rusticl) with Mesa, 1.2+ on GCN 1.Gen)				2.0+ (Adrenalin driver on Win 7+) (on Linux ROCm, Mesa 1.2+ (no support in Clover, only Rusticl, Mesa, 2.0+ and 3.0 with AMD drivers or AMD ROCm), 5th gen: 2.2 win 10+ and Linux RocM 5.0+				2.2+ and 3.0 Windows 8.1+ and Linux ROCm 5.0+ (Mesa Rusticl 1.2+ and 3.0 (2.1+ and 2.2+))			
HSA / ROCm	—N/a																Yes					?			
Video decoding ASIC	—N/a										Avivo/UVD	UVD+	UVD 2	UVD 2.2	UVD 3		UVD 4	UVD 4.2	UVD 5.0 or 6.0	UVD 6.3	UVD 7 (Note: The UVD and VCE were replaced by the Video Core Next (VCN) ASIC in the Raven Ridge APU implementation of Vega.)	VCN 2.0	VCN 3.0	VCN 4.0	VCN 5.0
Video encoding ASIC	—N/a																VCE 1.0	VCE 2.0	VCE 3.0 or 3.1	VCE 3.4	VCE 4.0	VCN 2.0	VCN 3.0	VCN 4.0	VCN 5.0
Fluid Motion (Note: Video processing for video frame rate interpolation technique. In Windows it works as a DirectShow filter in your player. In Linux, there is no support on the part of drivers and / or community.)	No																	Yes				No		?	
Power saving	?										PowerPlay				PowerTune		PowerTune & ZeroCore Power					?			
TrueAudio	—N/a																	Via dedicated DSP		Via shaders					
FreeSync	—N/a																	1; 2							
HDCP (Note: To play protected video content, it also requires card, operating system, driver, and application support. A compatible HDCP display is also needed for this. HDCP is mandatory for the output of certain audio formats, placing additional constraints on the multimedia setup.)	—N/a										?							1.4		2.2		2.3			
PlayReady	—N/a																			3.0	No	3.0			
Supported displays (Note: More displays may be supported with native DisplayPort connections, or splitting the maximum resolution between multiple monitors with active converters.)						1–2	2							2–6								?			4
Max. resolution	?													2–6 × 2560×1600			2–6 × 4096×2160 @ 30 Hz			2–6 × 5120×2880 @ 60 Hz	3 × 7680×4320 @ 60 Hz	7680×4320 @ 60 Hz PowerColor		7680x4320 @165 Hz	7680x4320
/drm/radeon (Note: DRM (Direct Rendering Manager) is a component of the Linux kernel. AMDgpu is the Linux kernel module. Support in this table refers to the most current version.)						Yes													—N/a						
/drm/amdgpu	—N/a																Yes Kernel 6.19+		Yes						

== See also ==
- AMD Radeon Pro
- AMD FirePro
- AMD FireMV
- AMD FireStream
- AMD Vega
- List of AMD graphics processing units
