= Radeon 6000 series =

Radeon 6000 series may refer to two different series of graphics processing units (GPUs) developed by Advanced Micro Devices (AMD):

- Radeon RX 6000 series, released in 2020
- Radeon HD 6000 series, released in 2010
