= Radeon HD 6000 series =

Series of video cards

AMD Radeon HD 6000 series
- Release date: October 22, 2010; 15 years ago
- Codename: Northern Islands; Vancouver
- Architecture: TeraScale 2 TeraScale 3
- Transistors: 292M 40 nm (Cedar); 370M 40 nm (Caicos); 716M 40 nm (Turks); 1.040M 40 nm (Juniper); 1.700M 40 nm (Barts); 2.640M 40 nm (Cayman); 2x 2.640M 40 nm (Antilles)

Cards
- Entry-level: 6350; 6450; 6570
- Mid-range: 6670; 6750; 6770; 6790
- High-end: 6850; 6870; 6930; 6950; 6970
- Enthusiast: 6990

API support
- Direct3D: Direct3D 11 (feature level 11_0); Shader Model 5.0
- OpenCL: OpenCL 1.2
- OpenGL: OpenGL 4.5

History
- Predecessor: Radeon HD 5000 series
- Successor: Radeon HD 7000 series

Support status
- Unsupported

The Northern Islands series is a family of GPUs developed by Advanced Micro Devices (AMD) forming part of its Radeon-brand, based on the 40 nm process. Some models are based on TeraScale 2 (VLIW5), some on the new TeraScale 3 (VLIW4) introduced with them.

Starting with this family, the former ATI brand was officially discontinued in favor of making a correlation between the graphics products and the AMD branding for computing platforms (the CPUs and chipsets). Therefore, the AMD brand was used as the replacement. The logo for graphics products and technologies also received a minor makeover (using design elements of the 2010 "AMD Vision" logo). This also marks the end of the "Mobility Radeon" name in their laptop GPUs, keeping only the "M" suffix in the GPU model number to signify a Mobile variant.

Its direct competitor was NVIDIA's GeForce 500 series; they were launched approximately a month apart.

== Architecture ==
This article is about all products under the Radeon HD 6000 series brand.

- A GPU implementing TeraScale 2 version "Northern Island (VLIW5)" is found on all models except the "HD 6900" branded products.
- The "HD 6350" is based on TeraScale 2 "Evergreen".
- A GPU implementing TeraScale 3 version "Northern Island (VLIW4)" is found on "HD 6900" branded products.
- OpenGL 4.x compliance requires supporting FP64 shaders. These are implemented by emulation on some TeraScale (microarchitecture) GPUs.

=== Multi-monitor support ===
The AMD Eyefinity-branded on-die display controllers were introduced in September 2009 in the Radeon HD 5000 series and have been present in all products since.

=== Video acceleration ===
Unified Video Decoder (UVD3) is present on the die of all products and supported by AMD Catalyst and by the free and open-source graphics device driver.

=== OpenCL (API) ===
OpenCL accelerates many scientific Software Packages against CPU up to factor 10 or 100 and more. Open CL 1.0 to 1.2 are supported for all Chips with Terascale 2 and 3.

== Products ==
The 6800 series was the first batch of the Radeon 6000 series. Codenamed ''Northern Islands'', this series was released on October 22, 2010, after brief delays. Over the following months, the budget, midrange, and high-end cards were filled into the series.

=== Radeon HD 6400 ===
AMD released the entry-level Radeon HD 6400 GPU on February 7, 2011. Codenamed Caicos, it came to market at the same time as the Radeon HD 6500/6600 Turks GPUs. The sole Caicos product, the Radeon HD 6450, aimed to replace the HD 5450. Compared to the 5450 it has double the stream processors, GDDR5 support, along with new Northern Island technologies.

=== Radeon HD 6500/6600 ===
Codenamed Turks, these entry-level GPUs were released on February 7, 2011. The Turks' family includes Turks PRO and Turks XT which are marketed as HD 6570 and HD 6670 respectively. They were originally released to OEMs only, but later released to retail.

The Radeon HD 6570 and 6670 are minor upgrades of their Evergreen counterparts, the HD 5570 and 5670. Turks GPUs contain 80 more stream processors and 4 more texture units. They have also been upgraded to support the new technologies found in the Northern Islands GPUs such as HDMI 1.4a, UVD3, and stereoscopic 3D.

=== Radeon HD 6700 ===
Codenamed Barts LE, the Radeon HD 6790 was released on April 5, 2011. There is one retail product available, the Radeon HD 6790. Barts uses shaders of the same 5-way VLIW architecture as HD 5000 series.

- HD 6790 has 800 stream processors at 840 MHz, a 256-bit memory interface and 1 GB GDDR5 DRAM at 1 GHz with maximum power draw of 150W. Performance is superior to the NVIDIA GTX 550 Ti and Radeon HD 5770, less powerful than the Radeon HD 6850 and close to the GTX 460 768 MB and Radeon HD 5830.

AMD has confirmed that the HD 6700 cards use the Juniper XT and Juniper Pro cores from the HD 5700 series, and therefore they are not formally Northern Islands GPUs. Thus 6770 and 6750 are essentially the 5770 and 5750 respectively, with the label being the main difference. There are a few enhancements to the 5700 series, including:

- In the HD 6000-series cards, AMD's Universal Video Decoder was upgraded to version 3.0 which supported Blu-ray 3D codecs, hardware decoding for DivX / XviD and a list of other improvements. The HD 6750 and HD 6770 adds the MVC decode capability of UVD 3.0, but not the rest of the UVD 3.0 features.
- According to AMD, these cards have been upgraded to support HDMI 1.4a but without the 3D features brought forward by UVD 3.0.

=== Radeon HD 6800 ===
Codenamed Barts, the Radeon HD 6800 series was released on October 23, 2010. Products include Radeon HD 6850 and Radeon HD 6870. Barts uses shaders of the same 5-way VLIW architecture as HD 5000 series.

- HD 6850 has 960 stream processors at 775 MHz, a 256-bit memory interface and 1 GB GDDR5 DRAM at 1 GHz with maximum power draw of 127 W. Compared to competitors, performance falls in line with the 1 GB cards of the Nvidia GeForce GTX 460. Compared to predecessor graphics of the Radeon 5800 series, the 6850 is significantly faster than the Radeon HD 5830 and close to the performance of the Radeon HD 5850. A single 6-pin PCIe power connector requirement makes it suitable for most power supplies.
- HD 6870 has 1120 stream processors at 900 MHz (most GPUs are able to run with 980-1000 MHz), a 256-bit memory interface and 1 GB GDDR5 DRAM at 1.05 GHz (can be overclocked to 1.2 GHz (4.8 GHz effective)) with a maximum power draw of 151 W. Performance is superior to the GeForce GTX 460, comparable to the GeForce GTX 560, and less than the GeForce GTX 560 Ti. Compared to predecessor graphics cards of the Radeon 5800 series, the HD 6870 is faster than the HD 5850 and close to the performance of the Radeon HD 5870.

=== Radeon HD 6900 ===
This family includes three different high-end products all based on TeraScale 3 (VLIW4)

Codenamed Cayman, the Radeon HD 6900 series was expected to be released on November 12, 2010. These release dates were pushed further back and Cayman was released on December 15, 2010. Products include Radeon HD 6950 and Radeon HD 6970. Cayman is based on new 4-way VLIW architecture, which was chosen over AMD's older VLIW5 in order to reduce complexity in the design of AMD's stream processors. Studies showed that few applications fully leveraged the extra stage in a VLIW5 SP. Reducing the stream processors to VLIW4 allows AMD to save on transistors for each individual SP and add more overall in the future.

- In games, the performance of HD 6970 is comparable to the NVIDIA GeForce GTX 570 and GTX 480. The Radeon HD 6950 is slightly slower than the 6970, comparable to slightly faster than the GTX 560 Ti and faster than the HD 5870. The HD 6950 was further discovered to be nearly identical to the 6970 in core design, though the 6950 has lower rated GDDR5 memory. Other than that, the two only differed in BIOS flashed software. As such, a BIOS flash would essentially upgrade the 6950 to a 6970. This was later addressed by AMD and its partners by laser cutting the extra cores (rather than simply disabling them in BIOS), and/or using non-reference card designs that would not work with a 6970 BIOS. Some 6950s can still be "unlocked", but it is much more difficult, requiring careful card selection and custom BIOS.
- Codenamed Antilles, the Enthusiast dual-GPU (dual-6970) Radeon HD 6990 was launched on March 9, 2011. It features an 830 MHz reference engine clock speed, 3072 stream processors, 5.1 TFLOPS computing performance, 192 texture units, 4 GB of GDDR5 frame buffer (DRAM), and 375 W maximum board power.
- The AMD Radeon HD 6990 (As with some other 6000 series AMD Cards) comes with a dual BIOS switch. This enables what some claim to be a hidden 'AMD Uber Mode', however it is used most commonly as a backup when flashing the BIOS. (The same method used to flash the HD 6950 to appear as a HD 6970)

AMD PowerTune technology was introduced as a part of AMD's ongoing commitment to enhance power efficiency in its range of graphics cards. Launched alongside the Radeon HD 6900 series, PowerTune aimed to maximize the performance of GPUs within specified power envelopes.

== Chipset table ==
=== Desktop Products ===
Model (Codename)	Release Date & Price	Architecture & Fab	Transistors & Die Size	Core		Fillrate (Note: Texture fillrate is calculated as the number of Texture Mapping Units multiplied by the base (or boost) core clock speed.) (Note: Pixel fillrate is calculated as the number of Render Output Units multiplied by the base (or boost) core clock speed.)		Processing power (Note: Precision performance is calculated from the base (or boost) core clock speed based on a FMA operation.) (GFLOPS)		Memory (Note: The effective data transfer rate of GDDR5 is quadruple its nominal clock, instead of double as it is with DDR memory.)				TDP (Watts)		Bus interface
Model (Codename)	Release Date & Price	Architecture & Fab	Transistors & Die Size	Config (Note: Unified Shaders : Texture Mapping Units : Render Output Units)	Clock (MHz)	Texture (GT/s)	Pixel (GP/s)	Single	Double	Size (MB)	Bus type & width	Clock (MHz)	Bandwidth (GB/s)	Idle	Max	Bus interface
Radeon HD 6350 (Cedar)	April 7, 2011 $23 USD	TeraScale 2; 40 nm	292×10^{6} 59 mm^{2}	80:8:4	650	5.2	2.6	104	—N/a	512	DDR3; 64-bit	800	12.8	6.4	19.1	PCIe 2.1 ×16
Radeon HD 6450 (Caicos)	February 7, 2011; OEM	TeraScale 2; 40 nm	370×10^{6} 67 mm^{2}	160:8:4	625; 750	5.0; 6.0	2.5; 3.0	200; 240	—N/a	512	DDR3; 64-bit	533; 800	8.5; 12.8	9	18; 27	PCIe 2.1 ×16
Radeon HD 6450 (Caicos)	April 7, 2011 $55 USD	TeraScale 2; 40 nm	370×10^{6} 67 mm^{2}	160:8:4	625; 750	5.0; 6.0	2.5; 3.0	200; 240	—N/a	512; 1024; 2048	DDR3; 64-bit	800; 900	12.8; 14.4	9	18; 27	PCIe 2.1 ×16
Radeon HD 6570 (Turks Pro)	February 7, 2011; OEM	TeraScale 2; 40 nm	716×10^{6} 118 mm^{2}	480:24:8	650	15.6	5.2	624	—N/a	1024	DDR3; 128-bit	900	28.8	10	44	PCIe 2.1 ×16
Radeon HD 6570 (Turks Pro)	April 19, 2011 $79 USD	TeraScale 2; 40 nm	716×10^{6} 118 mm^{2}	480:24:8	650	15.6	5.2	624	—N/a	2048; 4096	DDR3; GDDR5; 128-bit	667; 1000	21.3; 64	11	60	PCIe 2.1 ×16
Radeon HD 6670 (Turks XT)	April 19, 2011 $99 USD	TeraScale 2; 40 nm	716×10^{6} 118 mm^{2}	480:24:8	800	19.2	6.4	768	—N/a	512; 1024; 2048	DDR3; GDDR5; 128-bit	800; 1000	25.6; 64	12	66	PCIe 2.1 ×16
Radeon HD 6750 (Juniper Pro)	January 21, 2011; OEM	TeraScale 2; 40 nm	1040×10^{6} 166 mm^{2}	720:36:16	700	25.2	11.2	1008	—N/a	512; 1024	GDDR5; 128-bit	1150	73.6	16	86	PCIe 2.1 ×16
Radeon HD 6770 (Juniper XT)	April 19, 2011 ?	TeraScale 2; 40 nm	1040×10^{6} 166 mm^{2}	800:40:16	850	34.0	13.6	1360	—N/a	512; 1024	GDDR5; 128-bit	1200; 1050	76.8; 67.2	18	108	PCIe 2.1 ×16
Radeon HD 6790 (Barts LE)	April 4, 2011 $149 USD	TeraScale 2; 40 nm	1700×10^{6} 255 mm^{2}	800:40:16	840	33.6	13.4	1344	—N/a	1024	GDDR5; 256-bit	1050	134.4	19	150	PCIe 2.1 ×16
Radeon HD 6850 (Barts Pro)	October 22, 2010 $179 USD	TeraScale 2; 40 nm	1700×10^{6} 255 mm^{2}	960:48:32	775	37.2	24.8	1488	—N/a	1024	GDDR5; 256-bit	1000	128	19	127	PCIe 2.1 ×16
Radeon HD 6870 (Barts XT)	October 22, 2010 $239 USD	TeraScale 2; 40 nm	1700×10^{6} 255 mm^{2}	1120:56:32	900	50.4	28.8	2016	—N/a	1024; 2048	GDDR5; 256-bit	1050	134.4	19	151	PCIe 2.1 ×16
Radeon HD 6930 (Cayman CE)	December 2011 $180 USD	TeraScale 3; 40 nm	2640×10^{6} 389 mm^{2}	1280:80:32	750	60.0	24.0	1920	480	1024; 2048	GDDR5; 256-bit	1200	153.6	18	186	PCIe 2.1 ×16
Radeon HD 6950 (Cayman Pro)	December 15, 2010 $259 USD $299 USD	TeraScale 3; 40 nm	2640×10^{6} 389 mm^{2}	1408:88:32	800	70.4	25.6	2253	563	1024; 2048	GDDR5; 256-bit	1250; 1250	160	20	200	PCIe 2.1 ×16
Radeon HD 6970 (Cayman XT)	December 15, 2010 $369 USD	TeraScale 3; 40 nm	2640×10^{6} 389 mm^{2}	1536:96:32	880	84.5	28.2	2703	675	2048	GDDR5; 256-bit	1375	176	20	250	PCIe 2.1 ×16
Radeon HD 6990 (Antilles XT)	March 8, 2011 $699 USD	TeraScale 3; 40 nm	2× / 2640×10^{6} 389 mm^{2}	2× 1536:96:32	830	2× 79.6	2× 26.5	5099	1276.88	2× 2048	GDDR5; 256-bit	1250	2× 160	37	375	PCIe 2.1 ×16

==== IGP (HD 6xxx) ====
- All models are based on the VLIW5 ISA
- All models support DirectX 11.0, OpenGL 4.5 (beta), OpenCL 1.2
- All models do not feature double-precision FP
- All models feature the UNB/MC Bus interface
- All models feature Angle independent anisotropic filtering, UVD3, and Eyefinity capabilities, with up to three outputs. HD 63xxD and higher feature 3D Blu-ray acceleration, while the standard 63xx (non-'D') does not.

Desktop

Model	Launch	Codename	Architecture	Fab (nm)	Core Clock rate (MHz)	Config core (Note: Unified Shaders : Texture Mapping Units : Render Output Units)	Fillrate		Shared Memory			Processing power (GFLOPS)	API compliance (version)				Combined TDP (Note: TDP specified for AMD reference designs, includes CPU power consumption. Actual TDP of retail products may vary.)		APU Series
Model	Launch	Codename	Architecture	Fab (nm)	Core Clock rate (MHz)	Config core	Pixel (GP/s)	Texture (GT/s)	Bus width (bit)	Bus type	Bandwidth (GB/s)	Processing power (GFLOPS)	Direct3D	OpenGL	OpenCL	Vulkan	Idle (W)	Max. (W)	APU Series
Radeon HD 6370D	November 1, 2011	WinterPark	TeraScale 2	32	443	160:8:4	1.77	3.54	128	DDR3-1600	25.6	142	11.3 (11_0)	4.5	1.2	—N/a	Unknown	65	E2
Radeon HD 6410D	June 20, 2011	WinterPark	TeraScale 2	32	443 (Note: A4-3300 series runs the Radeon HD 6410D at a speed of 443 MHz. Remaining A4 series run at 600 MHz.)–600	160:8:4	1.77–2.4	3.54–4.8	128	DDR3-1600	25.6	142–192	11.3 (11_0)	4.5	1.2	—N/a	Unknown	65	A4
Radeon HD 6530D	June 20, 2011	BeaverCreek	TeraScale 2	32	443	320:16:8	3.54	7.08	128	DDR3-1866	29.9	284	11.3 (11_0)	4.5	1.2	—N/a	Unknown	65–100	A6
Radeon HD 6550D	June 20, 2011	BeaverCreek	TeraScale 2	32	600	400:20:8	4.8	12	128	DDR3-1866	29.9	480	11.3 (11_0)	4.5	1.2	—N/a	Unknown	65–100	A8

Ultra-mobile

Model	Released	Code name	Architecture	Fab (nm)	Core clock rate (MHz)	Config core (Note: Unified Shaders : Texture Mapping Units : Render Output Units : Compute units)	Fillrate		Shared memory			Processing power (GFLOPS)	API compliance (version)				Combined TDP (Note: TDP specified for AMD reference designs, includes CPU power consumption. Actual TDP of retail products may vary.)		APU
Model	Released	Code name	Architecture	Fab (nm)	Core clock rate (MHz)	Config core	Pixel (GP/s)	Texture (GT/s)	Bandwidth (GB/s)	Bus type	Bus width (bit)	Processing power (GFLOPS)	Direct3D	OpenGL	OpenCL	Vulkan	Idle (W)	Max. (W)	APU
Radeon HD 6250	November 9, 2010	Wrestler	TeraScale 2	40	280–400	80:8:4:2	1.12–1.6	2.24–3.2	8.525	DDR3-1066	64	44.8–64	11.3 (11_0)	4.5	1.2	—N/a	Unknown	9	C-30, C-50, Z-60
Radeon HD 6290	January 7, 2011	Ontario	TeraScale 2	40	276–400	80:8:4:2	1.12–1.6	2.24–3.2	8.525	DDR3-1066	64	44.8–64	11.3 (11_0)	4.5	1.2	—N/a	Unknown	9	C-60
Radeon HD 6310	November 9, 2010	Wrestler	TeraScale 2	40	492	80:8:4:2	2.0	4.0	8.525	DDR3-1066	64	80	11.3 (11_0)	4.5	1.2	—N/a	Unknown	18	E-240, E-300, E-350
Radeon HD 6320	August 15, 2011	Wrestler	TeraScale 2	40	508–600	80:8:4:2	2.032–2.4	4.064–4.8	10.6	DDR3-1333	64	82–97	11.3 (11_0)	4.5	1.2	—N/a	Unknown	18	E-450

=== Mobile Products ===
Model	Launch	Architecture Fab	Core		Fillrate (Note: Texture fillrate is calculated as the number of Texture Mapping Units multiplied by the core clock speed.) (Note: Pixel fillrate is calculated as the number of Render Output Units multiplied by the core clock speed.)		Processing power (Note: Single Precision performance is calculated from the core clock speed based on a FMA operation.) (GFLOPS)	Memory				TDP (Watts)	Bus interface
Model	Launch	Architecture Fab	Config (Note: Unified Shaders : Texture Mapping Units : Render Output Units)	Clock (MHz)	Pixel (GP/s)	Texture (GT/s)	Processing power (GFLOPS)	Size (MiB)	Bus type & width	Clock (MHz)	Bandwidth (GB/s)	TDP (Watts)	Bus interface
Radeon HD 6330M (Robson LP)	November 2010	TeraScale 2; 40 nm	80:8:4	500	2.0	4.0	80	1024	DDR3; 64-bit	800	12.8	7	PCIe 2.1 x16
Radeon HD 6350M (Robson Pro)	November 2010	TeraScale 2; 40 nm	80:8:4	500	2.0	4.0	80	1024	DDR3; 64-bit	800; 900	12.8; 14.4	7	PCIe 2.1 x16
Radeon HD 6370M (Robson XT)	November 2010	TeraScale 2; 40 nm	80:8:4	750	3.0	6.0	120	1024	DDR3; 64-bit	900	14.4	11	PCIe 2.1 x16
Radeon HD 6430M (Seymour LP)	January 2011	TeraScale 2; 40 nm	160:8:4	480	1.92	3.84	153.6	1024	DDR3; 64-bit	800	12.8	Unknown	PCIe 2.1 x16
Radeon HD 6450M (Seymour Pro)	January 2011	TeraScale 2; 40 nm	160:8:4	600	2.4	4.8	192	1024	DDR3; 64-bit	800	12.8	Unknown	PCIe 2.1 x16
Radeon HD 6470M (Seymour XT)	January 2011	TeraScale 2; 40 nm	160:8:4	700; 750	2.8; 3.0	5.6; 6.0	224; 240	1024	DDR3; 64-bit	800; 800	12.8	Unknown	PCIe 2.1 x16
Radeon HD 6490M (Seymour XT)	January 2011	TeraScale 2; 40 nm	160:8:4	800	3.2	6.4	256	512	GDDR5; 64-bit	800	25.6	Unknown	PCIe 2.1 x16
Radeon HD 6530M (Capilano Pro)	November 2010	TeraScale 2; 40 nm	400:20:8	500	4.0	10.0	400	1024	DDR3; 128-bit	900	28.8	26	PCIe 2.1 x16
Radeon HD 6550M (Capilano Pro)	November 2010	TeraScale 2; 40 nm	400:20:8	600	4.8	12.0	480	1024	DDR3; 128-bit	900	28.8	26	PCIe 2.1 x16
Radeon HD 6570M (Capilano XT)	November 2010	TeraScale 2; 40 nm	400:20:8	650	5.2	13.0	520	1024	DDR3; 64-bit GDDR5; 128-bit	900	28.8 57.6	30	PCIe 2.1 x16
Radeon HD 6630M (Whistler LP)	January 2011	TeraScale 2; 40 nm	480:24:8	485	3.88	11.64	465.6	256 (Mac) 1024	GDDR5; 128-bit (Mac); DDR3; 128-bit	800	51.2 (Mac) 25.6	Unknown	PCIe 2.1 x16
Radeon HD 6650M (Whistler Pro)	January 2011	TeraScale 2; 40 nm	480:24:8	600	4.8	14.4	576	1024	DDR3; 128-bit	900	28.8	Unknown	PCIe 2.1 x16
Radeon HD 6730M (Whistler XT)	January 2011	TeraScale 2; 40 nm	480:24:8	725	5.8	17.4	696	1024	DDR3; 128-bit	800	25.6	Unknown	PCIe 2.1 x16
Radeon HD 6750M (Whistler Pro)	January 2011	TeraScale 2; 40 nm	480:24:8	600	4.8	14.4	576	256; 512; 1024	GDDR5; 128-bit	800; 900	51.2; 57.6	Unknown	PCIe 2.1 x16
Radeon HD 6770M (Whistler XT)	January 2011	TeraScale 2; 40 nm	480:24:8	725	5.8	17.4	696	1024	GDDR5; 128-bit	900	57.6	Unknown	PCIe 2.1 x16
Radeon HD 6830M (Granville Pro)	January 2011	TeraScale 2; 40 nm	800:40:16	575	9.2	23.0	920	2048	DDR3; 128-bit	800	25.6	39	PCIe 2.1 x16
Radeon HD 6850M (Granville XT)	January 2011	TeraScale 2; 40 nm	800:40:16	675	10.8	27.0	1080	2048	DDR3; 128-bit	800	25.6	50	PCIe 2.1 x16
Radeon HD 6850M (Granville Pro)	January 2011	TeraScale 2; 40 nm	800:40:16	575	9.2	23.0	920	1024	GDDR5; 128-bit	800	57.6	39	PCIe 2.1 x16
Radeon HD 6870M (Granville XT)	January 2011	TeraScale 2; 40 nm	800:40:16	675	10.8	27	1080	1024	GDDR5; 128-bit	1000	64	50	PCIe 2.1 x16
Radeon HD 6950M (Blackcomb Pro)	January 2011	TeraScale 2; 40 nm	960:48:32	580	18.56	27.84	1113.6	2048	GDDR5; 256-bit	900	115.2	50	PCIe 2.1 x16
Radeon HD 6970M (Blackcomb XT)	January 2011	TeraScale 2; 40 nm	960:48:32	680	21.76	32.64	1305.6	2048	GDDR5; 256-bit	900	115.2	75	PCIe 2.1 x16
Radeon HD 6990M (Blackcomb XTX)	July 2011	TeraScale 2; 40 nm	1120:56:32	715	22.88	40.04	1601.6	2048	GDDR5; 256-bit	900	115.2	75	PCIe 2.1 x16

==== IGP (HD 6xxxG) ====
- All models are based on the VLIW5 ISA
- All models support DirectX 11.0, OpenGL 4.5 (beta), OpenCL 1.2
- All models do not feature double-precision FP
- All models feature the UNB/MC Bus interface
- All models feature Angle independent anisotropic filtering, UVD3 and Eyefinity capabilities, with up to 3 outputs.

Model	Released	Code name	Fab (nm)	Core Clock (MHz)	Config core^{1}	Fillrate		Shared Memory			GFLOPS	Combined TDP^{2} (W)	
Model	Released	Code name	Fab (nm)	Core Clock (MHz)	Config core^{1}	Pixel (GP/s)	Texture (GT/s)	Bandwidth (GB/s)	Bus type	Bus width (bit)	GFLOPS	Idle	Max.
Radeon HD 6380G	June 14, 2011	WinterPark (Note: used in E2-3000M APU)	32	400	160:8:4	1.6	3.2	17.06	DDR3-1333	128	128	Unknown	35
Radeon HD 6480G	June 14, 2011	BeaverCreek (Note: used in A4-3300M and A4-3310MX APU)	32	444	240:12:4	1.77	3.55	17.06	DDR3-1333	128	213.1	Unknown	35-45
Radeon HD 6520G	June 14, 2011	BeaverCreek (Note: used in A6-3400M and A6-3410MX APU)	32	400	320:16:8	3.2	6.4	17.06	DDR3-1333	128	256	Unknown	35-45
Radeon HD 6620G	June 14, 2011	BeaverCreek (Note: used in A8-3500M, A8-3510MX and A8-3530MX APU)	32	444	400:20:8	3.55	8.88	25.6	DDR3-1600	128	355.2	Unknown	35-45

- ^{1} Unified Shaders : Texture mapping units : Render output units
- ^{2} TDP specified for AMD reference designs, includes CPU power consumption. Actual TDP of retail products may vary.

== Radeon Feature Matrix ==
The following table shows features of AMD/ATI's GPUs (see also: List of AMD graphics processing units).

Name of GPU series	Wonder	Mach	3D Rage	Rage Pro	Rage 128	R100	R200	R300	R400	R500	R600	RV670	R700	Evergreen	Northern Islands		Southern Islands	Sea Islands	Volcanic Islands	Arctic Islands/Polaris	Vega	Navi 1x	Navi 2x	Navi 3x	Navi 4x
Released	1986	1991	Apr; 1996	Mar; 1997	Aug; 1998	Apr; 2000	Aug; 2001	Sep; 2002	May; 2004	Oct; 2005	May; 2007	Nov; 2007	Jun; 2008	Sep; 2009	Oct; 2010	Dec; 2010	Jan; 2012	Sep; 2013	Jun; 2015	Jun 2016, Apr 2017, Aug 2019	Jun 2017, Feb 2019	Jul; 2019	Nov; 2020	Dec; 2022	Feb; 2025
Marketing Name	Wonder	Mach	3D; Rage	Rage; Pro	Rage; 128	Radeon; 7000	Radeon; 8000	Radeon; 9000	Radeon; X700/X800	Radeon; X1000	Radeon; HD 2000	Radeon; HD 3000	Radeon; HD 4000	Radeon; HD 5000	Radeon; HD 6000		Radeon; HD 7000	Radeon; 200	Radeon; 300	Radeon; 400/500/600	Radeon; RX Vega, Radeon VII	Radeon; RX 5000	Radeon; RX 6000	Radeon; RX 7000	Radeon; RX 9000
AMD support	Ended																			Current					
Kind	2D		3D																						
Instruction set architecture	Not publicly known										TeraScale instruction set						GCN instruction set					RDNA instruction set			
Microarchitecture	Not publicly known					GFX1		GFX2			TeraScale 1 (VLIW5) (GFX3)			TeraScale 2 (VLIW5) (GFX4)	TeraScale 2 (VLIW5) up to 68xx (GFX4)	TeraScale 3 (VLIW4) in 69xx (GFX5)	GCN 1st gen (GFX6)	GCN 2nd gen (GFX7)	GCN 3rd gen (GFX8)	GCN 4th gen (GFX8)	GCN 5th gen (GFX9)	RDNA (GFX10.1)	RDNA 2 (GFX10.3)	RDNA 3 (GFX11)	RDNA 4 (GFX12)
Type	Fixed pipeline (Note: The Radeon R100 Series has programmable pixel shaders, but do not fully comply with DirectX 8 or Pixel Shader 1.0. See article on R100's pixel shaders.)						Programmable pixel & vertex pipelines				Unified shader model														
Direct3D	—N/a		5.0	6.0		7.0	8.1	9.0; 11 (9_2)	9.0b 11 (9_2)	9.0c 11 (9_3)	10.0; 11 (10_0)	10.1; 11 (10_1)		11 (11_0)			11 (11_1); 12 (11_1)	11 (12_0); 12 (12_0)			11 (12_1); 12 (12_1)		11 (12_1); 12 (12_2)		
Shader model	—N/a						1.4	2.0+	2.0b	3.0	4.0	4.1		5.0			5.1	5.1; 6.5			6.7				6.8
OpenGL	—N/a			1.1	1.2	1.3		1.5 (Note: R300, R400 and R500 based cards do not fully comply with OpenGL 2+ as the hardware does not support all types of non-power of two (NPOT) textures.)			3.3			4.5 (Windows), 4.6 (Linux Mesa 25.2+)			4.6 (Note: OpenGL 4+ compliance requires supporting FP64 shaders and these are emulated on some TeraScale chips using 32-bit hardware.)								
Vulkan	—N/a															1.1 (Note: Vulkan support is theoretically possible but has not been implemented in a stable driver.)	1.3 (Note: Vulkan support in Linux relies on the amdgpu kernel driver which is incomplete and not enabled by default for GFX6 and GFX7.)		1.4						
OpenCL	—N/a										Close to Metal		1.1 (not supported by Mesa)	1.2+ (on Linux: 1.1+ (no Image support on Clover, with Rusticl) with Mesa, 1.2+ on GCN 1.Gen)				2.0+ (Adrenalin driver on Win 7+) (on Linux ROCm, Mesa 1.2+ (no support in Clover, only Rusticl, Mesa, 2.0+ and 3.0 with AMD drivers or AMD ROCm), 5th gen: 2.2 win 10+ and Linux RocM 5.0+				2.2+ and 3.0 Windows 8.1+ and Linux ROCm 5.0+ (Mesa Rusticl 1.2+ and 3.0 (2.1+ and 2.2+))			
HSA / ROCm	—N/a																Yes					?			
Video decoding ASIC	—N/a										Avivo/UVD	UVD+	UVD 2	UVD 2.2	UVD 3		UVD 4	UVD 4.2	UVD 5.0 or 6.0	UVD 6.3	UVD 7 (Note: The UVD and VCE were replaced by the Video Core Next (VCN) ASIC in the Raven Ridge APU implementation of Vega.)	VCN 2.0	VCN 3.0	VCN 4.0	VCN 5.0
Video encoding ASIC	—N/a																VCE 1.0	VCE 2.0	VCE 3.0 or 3.1	VCE 3.4	VCE 4.0	VCN 2.0	VCN 3.0	VCN 4.0	VCN 5.0
Fluid Motion (Note: Video processing for video frame rate interpolation technique. In Windows it works as a DirectShow filter in your player. In Linux, there is no support on the part of drivers and / or community.)	No																	Yes				No		?	
Power saving	?										PowerPlay				PowerTune		PowerTune & ZeroCore Power					?			
TrueAudio	—N/a																	Via dedicated DSP		Via shaders					
FreeSync	—N/a																	1; 2							
HDCP (Note: To play protected video content, it also requires card, operating system, driver, and application support. A compatible HDCP display is also needed for this. HDCP is mandatory for the output of certain audio formats, placing additional constraints on the multimedia setup.)	—N/a										?							1.4		2.2		2.3			
PlayReady	—N/a																			3.0	No	3.0			
Supported displays (Note: More displays may be supported with native DisplayPort connections, or splitting the maximum resolution between multiple monitors with active converters.)						1–2	2							2–6								?			4
Max. resolution	?													2–6 × 2560×1600			2–6 × 4096×2160 @ 30 Hz			2–6 × 5120×2880 @ 60 Hz	3 × 7680×4320 @ 60 Hz	7680×4320 @ 60 Hz PowerColor		7680x4320 @165 Hz	7680x4320
/drm/radeon (Note: DRM (Direct Rendering Manager) is a component of the Linux kernel. AMDgpu is the Linux kernel module. Support in this table refers to the most current version.)						Yes													—N/a						
/drm/amdgpu	—N/a																	Optional	Yes						

== See also ==
- Radeon HD 2000 series
- Radeon HD 3000 series
- Radeon HD 4000 series
- Radeon HD 5000 series
- Radeon HD 7000 series
- Radeon HD 8000 series
- AMD Radeon Rx 200 series (successor to HD 8000 series)
- List of AMD graphics processing units
- Free and open-source graphics device driver § ATI/AMD
