= ATI TruForm =

Brand name by ATI

ATI TruForm was a brand by ATI (now AMD) for a SIP block capable of doing a graphics procedure called tessellation in computer hardware. ATI TruForm was included into Radeon 8500 (available from August 2001 on) and newer products.

The successor of the SIP block branded "ATI TruForm" was included into Radeon HD 2000 series (available from June 2007 on) and newer products: hardware tessellation with TeraScale.

Support for hardware tessellation only became mandatory in Direct3D 11 and OpenGL 4. Tessellation as defined in those APIs is only supported by newer TeraScale 2 (VLIW5) products introduced in September 2009 and GCN-based products (available from January 2012 on). The GCN SIP block carrying out the tessellation is the "Geometric processor".

== Overview ==
Before the adoption of pixel shader-enhanced bump mapping methods such as normal and parallax mapping that simulate higher mesh detail, curved 3D shapes in games were created with large numbers of triangles. The more triangles are used, the more detailed and thus less polygonal the surface appears. TruForm creates a curved surface using the existing triangles, and tessellates this surface to make a new, more detailed polygonal model. TruForm employed N-Patches, also known as PN triangles, which was supported by Microsoft's DirectX 8.0 and OpenGL technologies. The PN-triangles method replaced each flat triangle with a cubic Bezier patch and a separate normal interpolant derived from the triangle's existing vertex positions and normals; in OpenGL, ATI exposed it through the GL_ATI_pn_triangles extension. It is designed to increase visual quality, without significantly impacting frame rates, by utilizing hardware processing of geometry.

TruForm was not significantly accepted by game developers because it had to be implemented in the engine and applied selectively to appropriate objects to avoid visual problems, such as ballooned-up weapons. The lack of industry-wide support of the technique from the competition caused developers to ignore the technology.

In later version of Catalyst drivers, the TruForm feature is removed.

Beginning with Radeon X1000 series, TruForm was no longer advertised as a hardware feature. However, Radeon 9500 and higher (as well as hardware supporting Shader Model 3.0) include Render to Vertex Buffer feature, which can be used for tessellation applications. In the case of Radeon X1000 series, it supports binding up to 5 R2VB buffers simultaneously. Tessellation as dedicated hardware has returned in Xenos and Radeon R600 GPUs.

== Games with TruForm support ==
- Bugdom 2
- Command & Conquer: Renegade
- Counter-Strike (ati_subdiv "2.0", ati_npatch "1.0")
- The Elder Scrolls III: Morrowind (unofficially, with the FPS Optimizer )
- FTEQW (QuakeWorld, Net Quake, Quake II, Quake, Quake III: Arena, Hexen 2, Nexuiz)
- Hexen II (TruHexen2 Patch, edit of the TruQuake2 Patch) (developed by RaVeN )
- Madden NFL 2004
- Neverwinter Nights (must edit the game's ".ini" file and set "Enable Truform=1")
- Quake (TruQuake Patch)
- Quake 2 (TruQuake2 Patch)
- Quake III Arena (developed by RaVeN )
- Return to Castle Wolfenstein
- Serious Sam
- Soldier of Fortune
- Soldier of Fortune II: Double Helix
- Tom Clancy's Rainbow Six
- Unreal Tournament (TruUT Patch)
- Unreal Tournament 2003 and 2004 (must edit the game's ".ini" file and set "UseNPatches=True")
- Wolfenstein: Enemy Territory
