= Tessellation (computer graphics) =

Computer graphics terminology

A simple tessellation pipeline rendering a smooth sphere from a crude cubic vertex set using a subdivision method

In computer graphics, tessellation is the dividing of datasets of polygons (sometimes called vertex sets) presenting objects in a scene into suitable structures for rendering. Especially for real-time rendering, data is tessellated into triangles, for example in OpenGL 4.0 and Direct3D 11.

== In graphics rendering ==
A key advantage of tessellation for realtime graphics is that it allows detail to be dynamically added and subtracted from a 3D polygon mesh and its silhouette edges based on control parameters (often camera distance). In previously leading realtime techniques such as parallax mapping and bump mapping, surface details could be simulated at the pixel level, but silhouette edge detail was fundamentally limited by the quality of the original dataset.

In Direct3D 11 pipeline (a part of DirectX 11), the graphics primitive is the patch. The tessellator generates a triangle-based tessellation of the patch according to tessellation parameters such as the TessFactor, which controls the degree of fineness of the mesh. The tessellation, along with shaders such as a Phong shader, allows for producing smoother surfaces than would be generated by the original mesh. By offloading the tessellation process onto the GPU hardware, smoothing can be performed in real time. Tessellation can also be used for implementing subdivision surfaces, level of detail scaling and fine displacement mapping. OpenGL 4.0 uses a similar pipeline, where tessellation into triangles is controlled by the Tessellation Control Shader and a set of four tessellation parameters.

== In computer-aided design ==
In computer-aided design the constructed design is represented by a boundary representation topological model, where analytical 3D surfaces and curves, limited to faces, edges, and vertices, constitute a continuous boundary of a 3D body. Arbitrary 3D bodies are often too complicated to analyze directly. So they are approximated (tessellated) with a mesh of small, easy-to-analyze pieces of 3D volume—usually either irregular tetrahedra, or irregular hexahedra. The mesh is used for finite element analysis.

The mesh of a surface is usually generated per individual faces and edges (approximated to polylines) so that original limit vertices are included into mesh. To ensure that approximation of the original surface suits the needs of further processing, three basic parameters are usually defined for the surface mesh generator:

- The maximum allowed distance between the planar approximation polygon and the surface (known as "sag"). This parameter ensures that mesh is similar enough to the original analytical surface (or the polyline is similar to the original curve).
- The maximum allowed size of the approximation polygon (for triangulations it can be maximum allowed length of triangle sides). This parameter ensures enough detail for further analysis.
- The maximum allowed angle between two adjacent approximation polygons (on the same face). This parameter ensures that even very small humps or hollows that can have significant effect to analysis will not disappear in mesh.

An algorithm generating a mesh is typically controlled by the above three and other parameters. Some types of computer analysis of a constructed design require an adaptive mesh refinement, which is a mesh made finer (using stronger parameters) in regions where the analysis needs more detail.

== See also ==
- ATI TruForm – brand for their hardware tessellation unit from 2001
- TeraScale (microarchitecture) § Hardware tessellation – newer unit from June 2007
- Graphics Core Next § Geometric processor – most current unit from January 2011
- Tessellation shader
- Progressive mesh
- Mesh generation
- Tiled rendering
