= Unified shader model =

GPU whose shading hardware has equal capabilities for all stages of rendering

The unified shader model uses the same hardware resources for both vertex and fragment processing.

In the field of 3D computer graphics, the unified shader model (known in Direct3D 10 as "Shader Model 4.0") refers to a form of shader hardware in a graphical processing unit (GPU) where all of the shader stages in the rendering pipeline (geometry, vertex, pixel, etc.) have the same capabilities. They can all read textures and buffers, and they use instruction sets that are almost identical.

== History ==
Earlier GPUs generally included two types of shader hardware, with the vertex shaders having considerably more instructions than the simpler pixel shaders. This lowered the cost of implementation of the GPU as a whole, and allowed more shaders in total on a single unit. This was at the cost of making the system less flexible, and sometimes leaving one set of shaders idle if the workload used one more than the other. As improvements in fabrication continued, this distinction became less useful. ATI Technologies introduced a unified architecture on the hardware they developed for the Xbox 360. Nvidia quickly followed with their Tesla design. AMD introduced a unified shader in card form two years later in the TeraScale line. The concept has been universal since then.

Early shader abstractions (such as Shader Model 1.x) used very different instruction sets for vertex shaders and pixel shaders, with vertex shaders having a much more flexible instruction set. Later shader models (such as Shader Model 2.x and 3.0) reduced these differences, approaching a unified shader model. Even in a unified model, instruction sets may not be completely identical between different shader types; different shader stages may retain a few distinctions. Fragment shaders (pixel shaders) can compute implicit texture coordinate gradients, while geometry shaders can emit rendering primitives.

== Unified shader architecture ==
Unified shader architecture (or unified shading architecture) is a hardware design by which all shader processing units of a piece of graphics hardware are capable of handling any type of shading tasks. Most often Unified Shading Architecture hardware is composed of an array of computing units and some form of dynamic scheduling/load balancing system that ensures that all of the computational units are kept working as often as possible.

Unified shader architecture allows for more flexible use of graphics rendering hardware. For example, in a situation with a heavy geometry workload, the system could allocate most computing units to run vertex shaders and geometry shaders. In cases with a lighter vertex workload and a heavier pixel workload, more computing units could be allocated to run pixel shaders.

While unified shader architecture hardware and unified shader model programming interfaces are not a requirement for each other, a unified architecture is most sensible when designing hardware intended to support an API offering a unified shader model.

OpenGL 3.0 (which offers a unified shader model) can still be implemented on hardware that does not have unified shader architecture. Similarly, hardware that supported non unified shader model APIs could be based on a unified shader architecture, as is the case with Xenos graphics chip in Xbox 360, for example.

OpenGL ES introduced unified shader model since OpenGL ES 2.0.

The unified shader architecture was introduced with the Nvidia GeForce 8 series, ATI Radeon HD 2000 series, S3 Chrome 400, Intel GMA X3000 series, Xbox 360's GPU, Qualcomm Adreno 200 series, Mali Midgard, PowerVR SGX GPUs and is used in all subsequent series.

For example, the unified shader is referred as "CUDA core", "unified shader core" or "shader core" on NVIDIA GPUs, and is referred as "ALU core" on Intel GPUs.

== Architectures ==
Nvidia

- Tesla
- Fermi
- Kepler
- Maxwell
- Pascal
- Volta
- Turing
- Ampere
- Ada Lovelace
- Blackwell

Intel

- Intel Arc

ATI/AMD

- TeraScale
- Graphics Core Next
- RDNA
- CDNA
