= Radeon HD 8000 series =

Family of GPUs by AMD

AMD Radeon HD 8000 series (OEM)
- Release date: Q2 2013
- Codename: Southern Islands; Sea Islands; Solar System; Richland; Kabini
- Architecture: TeraScale 2 TeraScale 3 GCN 1st gen GCN 2nd gen
- Transistors: 292M (Cedar) 40 nm; 370M (Caicos) 40 nm; 950M (Oland) 28 nm; 1.500M (Cape Verde) 28 nm; 2.080M (Bonaire) 28 nm; 2.800M (Pitcairn) 28 nm; 4.313M (Tahiti) 28 nm; 2 x 4.313M (Malta) 28 nm

Cards
- Entry-level: 8350; 8450; 8470; 8490; 8570; 8670; 8730
- Mid-range: 8760; 8770
- High-end: 8870; 8950; 8970
- Enthusiast: 8990

API support
- Direct3D: Direct3D 12.0 (feature level 11_1) (GCN version); Shader Model 6.5 (GCN) or Shader Model 5.0
- OpenCL: OpenCL 2.1 (GCN version)
- OpenGL: OpenGL 4.5 OpenGL 4.6 (GCN only, Windows 7+ and Adrenalin 18.4.1+, Linux)
- Vulkan: Vulkan 1.2 (GCN, Windows), Vulkan 1.3 (GCN, Linux), or none (TeraScale); SPIR-V

History
- Predecessor: Radeon HD 7000 series
- Successor: Radeon R5/R7/R9 200 series

Support status
- Unsupported

The Radeon HD 8000 series is a family of computer GPUs developed by AMD. AMD was initially rumored to release the family in the second quarter of 2013, with the cards manufactured on a 28 nm process and making use of the improved Graphics Core Next architecture. However the 8000 series turned out to be an OEM rebadge of the 7000 series (although Bonaire is a GCN 2.0 based chip, thus being of newer development).

== Architecture ==
The Radeon HD 7000 series was launched in 2011 and it marked AMD's shift from VLIW (TeraScale) to RISC/SIMD architecture (Graphics Core Next). The highend-mainstream cards were equipped with GCN-based chips while some of the mid-low end ones were just rebranded TeraScale-based cards. All of the GCN-based chips were made using the 28 nm process, becoming the first chips ever to be based on that technology. The GCN-based chips for desktop cards were codenamed as Southern Islands, while the mobile ones (again, only the GCN-based and not the rebranded ones) were codenamed as Solar System.

=== Multi-monitor support ===
The AMD Eyefinity-branded on-die display controllers were introduced in September 2009 alongside the Radeon HD 5000 series and have been present on all chips since then.

=== Video acceleration ===
Both Unified Video Decoder (UVD) and Video Coding Engine (VCE) are present on all GCN-based chips (starting with the GCN 1.0 HD 7000 series). Both are fully supported by AMD Catalyst and by the free and open-source graphics device driver#ATI/AMD.

=== OpenCL (API) ===
OpenCL accelerates many scientific Software Packages against CPU up to factor 10 or 100 and more. OpenCL 1.0 to 1.2 are supported for all Chips with TeraScale and GCN Architecture. OpenCL 2.0 is supported with GCN 2nd Gen. or 1.2 and higher) For OpenCL 2.1 and 2.2 only Driver Updates are necessary with OpenCL 2.0 conformant Cards.

=== Vulkan (API) ===
API Vulkan 1.0 is supported for all with GCN Architecture. Vulkan 1.1 (GCN 2nd Gen. or 1.2 and higher) will be supported with actual drivers in 2018 (here only HD 8770). On newer drivers Vulkan 1.1 on Windows and Linux is supported on all GCN-architecture based GPUs. Vulkan 1.2 is available with Adrenalin 20.1 and Linux Mesa 20.0 for GCN 2nd Gen. or higher.

== Chipset table ==
=== Desktop models ===
- Graphics Core Next (GCN) supports the Mantle API and Vulkan API
- OpenGL 4.5 support for TeraScale 2 with AMD Crimson Beta (driver version 15.30 or higher)
- OpenGL 4.5 and Vulkan 1.0 support for GCN 1.0 and higher with AMD Crimson 16.3 or higher.
- Vulkan 1.1 support for GCN 1.0 and higher with AMD Adrenalin 18.3.3 or higher.

Model (Codename)	Launch	Architecture (Fab)	Transistors Die Size	Core		Fillrate (Note: Boost values (if available) are stated below the base value in italic.) (Note: Texture fillrate is calculated as the number of Texture Mapping Units multiplied by the base (or boost) core clock speed.) (Note: Pixel fillrate is calculated as the number of Render Output Units multiplied by the base (or boost) core clock speed.)		Processing power (Note: Precision performance is calculated from the base (or boost) core clock speed based on a FMA operation.) (GFLOPS)		Memory (Note: The effective data transfer rate of GDDR5 is quadruple its nominal clock, instead of double as with DDR memory.)				TDP (W)	Bus interface
Model (Codename)	Launch	Architecture (Fab)	Transistors Die Size	Config (Note: Unified Shaders : Texture Mapping Units : Render Output Units)	Clock (MHz)	Texture (GT/s)	Pixel (GP/s)	Single	Double	Size (MiB)	Bus type & width (bit)	Clock (MHz)	Band- width (GB/s)	Idle Max	Bus interface
Radeon HD 8350 (Cedar)	January 8, 2013	TeraScale 2 (Note: Lacks hardware video encoder) (40 nm)	292×10^{6} 59 mm^{2}	80:8:4	400–650	3.2; 5.2	1.6; 2.6	104	—N/a	256; 512	DDR2; DDR3; 64-bit	400; 800	6.4; 12.8	6.4; 19.1	PCIe 2.1 ×16
Radeon HD 8450 (Caicos)	January 8, 2013	TeraScale 2 (40 nm)	370×10^{6} 67 mm^{2}	160:8:4	625	5.0	2.5	200	—N/a	512	DDR3; 64-bit	533	8.53	9; 18	PCIe 2.1 ×16
Radeon HD 8470 (Caicos)	January 8, 2013	TeraScale 2 (40 nm)	370×10^{6} 67 mm^{2}	160:8:4	750	6.0	3.0	240	—N/a	1024	GDDR5; 64-bit	800	25.6	9; 35	PCIe 2.1 ×16
Radeon HD 8490 (Caicos)	July 23, 2013	TeraScale 2 (40 nm)	370×10^{6} 67 mm^{2}	160:8:4	875	7.0	3.5	280	—N/a	1024	DDR3L; GDDR5; 64-bit	800; 900	12.8; 28.8	9; 35	PCIe 2.1 ×16
Radeon HD 8570 (Oland)	January 8, 2013	GCN 1^{st} gen (28 nm)	950×10^{6} 77 mm^{2}	384:24:8	730	19.2	6.4	560	35	2048	DDR3; GDDR5; 128-bit	900; 1150	28.8; 72	12; 66	PCIe 3.0 ×8
Radeon HD 8670 (Oland)	January 8, 2013	GCN 1^{st} gen (28 nm)	950×10^{6} 77 mm^{2}	384:24:8	1000	24	8	768	48	2048	GDDR5; 128-bit	1150	72	16; 86	PCIe 3.0 ×8
Radeon HD 8730 (Cape Verde LE)	September 5, 2013	GCN 1^{st} gen (28 nm)	1500×10^{6} 123 mm^{2}	384:24:8	800	19.2	6.4	614.4	44.8	1024	GDDR5; 128-bit	1125	72	10; 47	PCIe 3.0 ×16
Radeon HD 8760 (Cape Verde XT)	January 8, 2013	GCN 1^{st} gen (28 nm)	1500×10^{6} 123 mm^{2}	640:40:16	1000	40	16	1280	80	2048	GDDR5; 128-bit	1125	72	16; 80	PCIe 3.0 ×16
Radeon HD 8770 (Bonaire XT)	September 2, 2013	GCN 2^{nd} gen (28 nm)	2080×10^{6} 160 mm^{2}	896:56:16	1000	56.0	16.0	1792	128	2048	GDDR5; 128-bit	1500	96	10; 85	PCIe 3.0 ×16
Radeon HD 8870 (Pitcairn XT)	January 8, 2013	GCN 1^{st} gen (28 nm)	2800×10^{6} 212 mm^{2}	1280:80:32	1000	80	32	2560	160	2048	GDDR5; 256-bit	1200	153.6	15; 150	PCIe 3.0 ×16
Radeon HD 8950 (Tahiti Pro)	January 8, 2013	GCN 1^{st} gen (28 nm)	4313×10^{6} 352 mm^{2}	1792:112:32	850; 925	95.2; 103.6	27.2; 29.6	3046.4; 3315.2	761.6; 828.8	3072	GDDR5; 384-bit	1250	240	15; 225	PCIe 3.0 ×16
Radeon HD 8970 (Tahiti XT2)	January 8, 2013	GCN 1^{st} gen (28 nm)	4313×10^{6} 352 mm^{2}	2048:128:32	1000; 1050	128.0; 134.4	32; 33.6	4096; 4301	1024; 1075	3072	GDDR5; 384-bit	1500	288	15; 250	PCIe 3.0 ×16
Radeon HD 8990 (Malta)	April 24, 2013	GCN 1^{st} gen (28 nm)	2× 4313×10^{6} 2× 352 mm^{2}	2× 2048:128:32	950; 1000	2× 128	2× 32	7782; 8192	1946; 2048	2× 3072	GDDR5; 384-bit	1500	2× 288	15; 375	PCIe 3.0 ×16
Model (Codename)	Launch	Architecture (Fab)	Transistors Die Size	Config	Clock (MHz)	Texture (GT/s)	Pixel (GP/s)	Single	Double	Size (MiB)	Bus type & width (bit)	Clock (MHz)	Band- width (GB/s)	Idle Max	Bus interface
Model (Codename)	Launch	Architecture (Fab)	Transistors Die Size	Core		Fillrate		Processing power (GFLOPS)		Memory				TDP (W)	Bus interface

=== Mobile Models ===
Model (Codename)	Launch	Architecture (Fab)	Core		Fillrate (Note: Boost values (if available) are stated below the base value in italic.) (Note: Texture fillrate is calculated as the number of Texture Mapping Units multiplied by the base (or boost) core clock speed.) (Note: Pixel fillrate is calculated as the number of Render Output Units multiplied by the base (or boost) core clock speed.)		Processing power (Note: Precision performance is calculated from the base (or boost) core clock speed based on a FMA operation.) (GFLOPS)	Memory (Note: The effective data transfer rate of GDDR5 is quadruple its nominal clock, instead of double as it is with other DDR memory.)				TDP (W)
Model (Codename)	Launch	Architecture (Fab)	Config (Note: Unified Shaders : Texture Mapping Units : Render Output Units)	Clock (MHz)	Texture (GT/s)	Pixel (GP/s)	Processing power (GFLOPS)	Size (GiB)	Bus type & width (bit)	Clock (MHz)	Band- width (GB/s)	TDP (W)
Radeon HD 8550M / 8630M (Sun LE)	8 January 2013	GCN 1^{st} gen (28 nm)	384:24:8	650; 700	15.6; 16.8	5.2; 5.6	537.6	1	DDR3; 64	900	14.4	Unknown
Radeon HD 8570M / 8650M (Sun Pro)	8 January 2013	GCN 1^{st} gen (28 nm)	384:24:8	650; 700	15.6; 16.8	5.2; 5.6	537.6	1	GDDR5; 64	1125	36	Unknown
Radeon HD 8670M (Mars XT)	8 January 2013	GCN 1^{st} gen (28 nm)	384:24:8	775; 825	18.6; 19.8	6.2; 6.6	633.6	1	DDR3; 64	900	14.4	Unknown
Radeon HD 8690M (Sun XT)	8 January 2013	GCN 1^{st} gen (28 nm)	384:24:8	775; 825	18.6; 19.8	6.2; 6.6	633.6	1	GDDR5; 64	1125	36	Unknown
Radeon HD 8730M (Mars LE)	8 January 2013	GCN 1^{st} gen (28 nm)	384:24:8	650; 700	15.6; 16.8	5.2; 5.6	537.6	2	DDR3; 128	1000	32	Unknown
Radeon HD 8750M (Mars Pro)	8 January 2013	GCN 1^{st} gen (28 nm)	384:24:8	620–775; 670–825	14.88; 19.8	4.96; 6.6	514.56; 633.6	2	DDR3; GDDR5; 128	1000	32; 64	Unknown
Radeon HD 8770M (Mars XT)	8 January 2013	GCN 1^{st} gen (28 nm)	384:24:8	775; 825	18.6; 19.8	6.2; 6.6	633.6	2	GDDR5; 128	1125	72	Unknown
Radeon HD 8790M (Mars XTX)	8 January 2013	GCN 1^{st} gen (28 nm)	384:24:8	850; 900	20.4; 21.6	6.8; 7.2	691.2	2	GDDR5; 128	1125	72	Unknown
Radeon HD 8830M (Venus LE)	8 January 2013	GCN 1^{st} gen (28 nm)	640:40:16	575; 625	23; 25	9.2; 10	800	2	DDR3; 128	1000	32	Unknown
Radeon HD 8850M (Venus Pro)	8 January 2013	GCN 1^{st} gen (28 nm)	640:40:16	575–725; 625–775	23; 31	9.2; 12.4	800; 992	2	DDR3; GDDR5; 128	1000; 1125	32; 72	Unknown
Radeon HD 8870M (Venus XT)	8 January 2013	GCN 1^{st} gen (28 nm)	640:40:16	725; 775	29; 31	11.6; 12.4	992	2	DDR3; GDDR5; 128	1000; 1125	32; 72	Unknown
Radeon HD 8970M (Neptune XT)	8 January 2013	GCN 1^{st} gen (28 nm)	1280:80:32	850; 900	68; 72	27.2; 28.8	2304	2; 4	GDDR5; 256	1200	153.6	100

=== Integrated Models ===
Model (Codename)	Launch	Architecture (Fab)	APU	Core config (Note: Unified Shaders : Texture Mapping Units : Render Output Units)	Clock rate		Fillrate (Note: Pixel fillrate is calculated as the number of ROPs multiplied by the base core clock speed.) (Note: Texture fillrate is calculated as the number of TMUs multiplied by the base core clock speed.)		Memory		Processing Power (Note: Precision performance is calculated from the base (or boost) core clock speed based on a FMA operation.) (GFLOPS)		TDP
Model (Codename)	Launch	Architecture (Fab)	APU	Core config	Core (MHz)	Memory (MHz)	Pixel (GP/s)	Texture (GT/s)	Bus type	Bus width (bit)	Single (boost)	Double (boost)	TDP
Radeon HD 8370D (Scrapper)	19 March 2013	TeraScale 3 (Note: Lacks hardware video encoder); 32 nm	A4-6300	128:8:4	760	System	3.04	6.08	DDR3	128	194.6	33	Unknown
Radeon HD 8470D (Scrapper)	19 March 2013	TeraScale 3; 32 nm	A6-6400	192:12:4	800	System	3.20	9.60	DDR3	128	307.2	Yes	Unknown
Radeon HD 8570D (Devastator)	19 March 2013	TeraScale 3; 32 nm	A8-6500; A8-6600K	256:16:8	800; 844	System	6.40	12.8	DDR3	128	432.1	Yes	Unknown
Radeon HD 8670D (Devastator)	19 March 2013	TeraScale 3; 32 nm	A10-6700; A10-6800K	384:24:8	844	System	6.75	20.3	DDR3	128	648.2	Yes	Unknown
Radeon HD 8310G		TeraScale 3; 32 nm	A4-5145M	128:8:4	424 (554)	System			DDR3L	128		Unknown	Unknown
Radeon HD 8350G	19 March 2013	TeraScale 3; 32 nm	A4-5150M	128:8:4	514 (720)	System	2.06	4.11	DDR3L	128	131.6 (184.3)	32.9	Unknown
Radeon HD 8410G (Scrapper)	May 2013	TeraScale 3; 32 nm	A6-5345M	192:24:4	450 (600)	System	1.80	10.80	DDR3L	128	172.8 (230.4)	Unknown	Unknown
Radeon HD 8450G (Scrapper)	23 May 2013	TeraScale 3; 32 nm	A6-535xM	192:12:4	533 (720)	1600	2.17	17.33	DDR3L	128	204.7 (276.5)	Unknown	35W
Radeon HD 8510G (Scrapper)	May 2013	TeraScale 3; 32 nm	A8-5545M	384:48:8	450 (554)	System	3.60	21.60	DDR3L	128	351.9 (425.5)	Unknown	19W
Radeon HD 8550G Devastator	19 March 2013	TeraScale 3; 32 nm	A8-555xM	256:16:8	515 (720)	System	4.12	8.24	DDR3L	128	263.7 (368.6)	Unknown	Unknown
Radeon HD 8610G Devastator	May 2013	TeraScale 3; 32 nm	A10-5745M	384:24:8	533 (626)	System			DDR3L	128	409.3 (489.8)	Unknown	Unknown
Radeon HD 8650G Devastator	19 March 2013	TeraScale 3; 32 nm	A10-575xM	384:24:8	533 (720)	System	4.26	12.8	DDR3L	128	409.3 (553.0)	Unknown	Unknown

== Radeon Feature Matrix ==
The following table shows features of AMD/ATI's GPUs (see also: List of AMD graphics processing units).

Name of GPU series	Wonder	Mach	3D Rage	Rage Pro	Rage 128	R100	R200	R300	R400	R500	R600	RV670	R700	Evergreen	Northern Islands		Southern Islands	Sea Islands	Volcanic Islands	Arctic Islands/Polaris	Vega	Navi 1x	Navi 2x	Navi 3x	Navi 4x
Released	1986	1991	Apr; 1996	Mar; 1997	Aug; 1998	Apr; 2000	Aug; 2001	Sep; 2002	May; 2004	Oct; 2005	May; 2007	Nov; 2007	Jun; 2008	Sep; 2009	Oct; 2010	Dec; 2010	Jan; 2012	Sep; 2013	Jun; 2015	Jun 2016, Apr 2017, Aug 2019	Jun 2017, Feb 2019	Jul; 2019	Nov; 2020	Dec; 2022	Feb; 2025
Marketing Name	Wonder	Mach	3D; Rage	Rage; Pro	Rage; 128	Radeon; 7000	Radeon; 8000	Radeon; 9000	Radeon; X700/X800	Radeon; X1000	Radeon; HD 2000	Radeon; HD 3000	Radeon; HD 4000	Radeon; HD 5000	Radeon; HD 6000		Radeon; HD 7000	Radeon; 200	Radeon; 300	Radeon; 400/500/600	Radeon; RX Vega, Radeon VII	Radeon; RX 5000	Radeon; RX 6000	Radeon; RX 7000	Radeon; RX 9000
AMD support	Ended																			Current					
Kind	2D		3D																						
Instruction set architecture	Not publicly known									Multiple (Note: R500 has two instruction sets. Vertex shader cores: "PVS instruction set". Pixel shader cores: "US instruction set".)	TeraScale instruction set						GCN instruction set					RDNA instruction set			
Microarchitecture	Not publicly known					GFX1		GFX2			TeraScale 1 (VLIW5) (GFX3)			TeraScale 2 (VLIW5) (GFX4)	TeraScale 2 (VLIW5) up to 68xx (GFX4)	TeraScale 3 (VLIW4) in 69xx (GFX5)	GCN 1st gen (GFX6)	GCN 2nd gen (GFX7)	GCN 3rd gen (GFX8)	GCN 4th gen (GFX8)	GCN 5th gen (GFX9)	RDNA (GFX10.1)	RDNA 2 (GFX10.3)	RDNA 3 (GFX11)	RDNA 4 (GFX12)
Type	Fixed pipeline (Note: The Radeon R100 Series has programmable pixel shaders, but do not fully comply with DirectX 8 or Pixel Shader 1.0. See article on R100's pixel shaders.)						Programmable pixel & vertex pipelines				Unified shader model														
Direct3D	—N/a		5.0	6.0		7.0	8.1	9.0; 11 (9_2)	9.0b 11 (9_2)	9.0c 11 (9_3)	10.0; 11 (10_0)	10.1; 11 (10_1)		11 (11_0)			11 (11_1); 12 (11_1)	11 (12_0); 12 (12_0)			11 (12_1); 12 (12_1)		11 (12_1); 12 (12_2)		
Shader model	—N/a						1.4	2.0+	2.0b	3.0	4.0	4.1		5.0			5.1	5.1; 6.5			6.7				6.8
OpenGL	—N/a			1.1	1.2	1.3		1.5 (Note: R300, R400 and R500 based cards do not fully comply with OpenGL 2+ as the hardware does not support all types of non-power of two (NPOT) textures.)			3.3			4.5 (Windows), 4.6 (Linux Mesa 25.2+)			4.6 (Note: OpenGL 4+ compliance requires supporting FP64 shaders and these are emulated on some TeraScale chips using 32-bit hardware.)								
Vulkan	—N/a															1.1 (Note: Vulkan support is theoretically possible but has not been implemented in a stable driver.)	1.3 (Note: Vulkan support in Linux relies on the AMDgpu kernel driver, the radeon driver does not support Vulkan.)		1.4						
OpenCL	—N/a										Close to Metal		1.1 (not supported by Mesa)	1.2+ (on Linux: 1.1+ (no Image support on Clover, with Rusticl) with Mesa, 1.2+ on GCN 1.Gen)				2.0+ (Adrenalin driver on Win 7+) (on Linux ROCm, Mesa 1.2+ (no support in Clover, only Rusticl, Mesa, 2.0+ and 3.0 with AMD drivers or AMD ROCm), 5th gen: 2.2 win 10+ and Linux RocM 5.0+				2.2+ and 3.0 Windows 8.1+ and Linux ROCm 5.0+ (Mesa Rusticl 1.2+ and 3.0 (2.1+ and 2.2+))			
HSA / ROCm	—N/a																Yes					?			
Video decoding ASIC	—N/a										Avivo/UVD	UVD+	UVD 2	UVD 2.2	UVD 3		UVD 4	UVD 4.2	UVD 5.0 or 6.0	UVD 6.3	UVD 7 (Note: The UVD and VCE were replaced by the Video Core Next (VCN) ASIC in the Raven Ridge APU implementation of Vega.)	VCN 2.0	VCN 3.0	VCN 4.0	VCN 5.0
Video encoding ASIC	—N/a																VCE 1.0	VCE 2.0	VCE 3.0 or 3.1	VCE 3.4	VCE 4.0	VCN 2.0	VCN 3.0	VCN 4.0	VCN 5.0
Fluid Motion (Note: Video processing for video frame rate interpolation technique. In Windows it works as a DirectShow filter in your player. In Linux, there is no support on the part of drivers and / or community.)	No																	Yes				No		?	
Power saving	?										PowerPlay				PowerTune		PowerTune & ZeroCore Power					?			
TrueAudio	—N/a																	Via dedicated DSP		Via shaders					
FreeSync	—N/a																	1; 2							
HDCP (Note: To play protected video content, it also requires card, operating system, driver, and application support. A compatible HDCP display is also needed for this. HDCP is mandatory for the output of certain audio formats, placing additional constraints on the multimedia setup.)	—N/a										?							1.4		2.2		2.3			
PlayReady	—N/a																			3.0	No	3.0			
Supported displays (Note: More displays may be supported with native DisplayPort connections, or splitting the maximum resolution between multiple monitors with active converters.)						1–2	2							2–6								?			4
Max. resolution	?													2–6 × 2560×1600			2–6 × 4096×2160 @ 30 Hz			2–6 × 5120×2880 @ 60 Hz	3 × 7680×4320 @ 60 Hz	7680×4320 @ 60 Hz PowerColor		7680x4320 @165 Hz	7680x4320
/drm/radeon (Note: DRM (Direct Rendering Manager) is a component of the Linux kernel. AMDgpu is the Linux kernel module. Support in this table refers to the most current version.)						Yes													—N/a						
/drm/amdgpu	—N/a																Yes Kernel 6.19+		Yes						

== See also ==
- Radeon HD 2000 series
- Radeon HD 3000 series
- Radeon HD 4000 series
- Radeon HD 5000 series
- Radeon HD 6000 series
- Radeon HD 7000 series
- Radeon 200 series
- GeForce 700 series
- List of AMD graphics processing units
- Free and open-source device drivers: graphics#ATI/AMD
