= Pro Duo =

Pro Duo may refer to:

- Memory Stick Pro Duo, a flash memory card format developed by Sony
- Radeon Pro Duo, a graphics card released by AMD in 2016
