= ROCm =

Parallel computing platform: GPGPU libraries and application programming interface

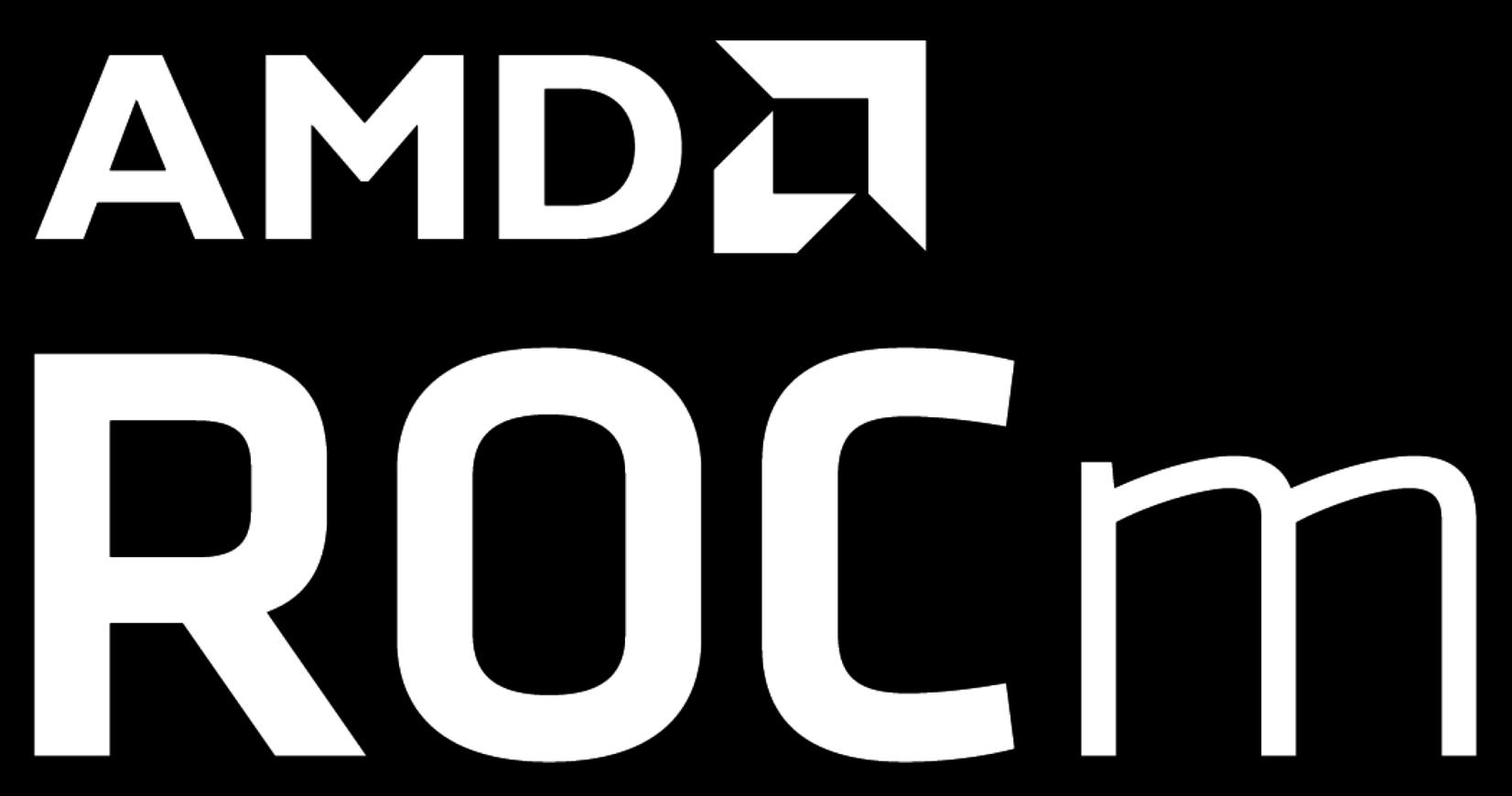
- Developer: AMD
- Release: November 14, 2016; 10 years ago
- Stable release: 10.0 / 27 August 2026; 2 months ago
- Written in: C, C++, Python, Fortran, Julia
- Middleware: HIP
- Engine: AMDgpu kernel driver, HIPCC, a LLVM-based compiler
- Operating system: Linux, Windows
- Platform: Supported GPUs
- Predecessor: Close to metal, Stream, HSA
- Size: <2 GiB
- Type: GPGPU libraries and APIs
- License: MIT License
- Website: www.amd.com/en/products/software/rocm.html
- Repository: Meta-repository github.com/ROCm/TheRock

ROCm is an Advanced Micro Devices (AMD) software stack for graphics processing unit (GPU) programming. ROCm spans several domains, including general-purpose computing on graphics processing units (GPGPU), high-performance computing (HPC), and heterogeneous computing. It offers several programming models: HIP (GPU-kernel-based programming), OpenMP (directive-based programming), and OpenCL.

ROCm is free, libre and open-source software (except the GPU firmware blobs), and it is distributed under various licenses. The name initially stood for Radeon Open Compute platform; however, due to Open Compute being a registered trademark, the name no longer functions as an acronym.

== Background ==
The first GPGPU software stack from ATI/AMD was Close to Metal, which became Stream.

ROCm was launched around 2016 with the Boltzmann Initiative. ROCm stack builds upon previous AMD GPU stacks; some tools trace back to GPUOpen and others to the Heterogeneous System Architecture (HSA).

In July 2026, AMD announce ROCm will be on six week release cycle.

=== Heterogeneous System Architecture Intermediate Language ===
HSAIL was aimed at producing a middle-level, hardware-agnostic intermediate representation that could be JIT-compiled to the eventual hardware (GPU, FPGA...) using the appropriate finalizer. This approach was dropped for ROCm: now it builds only GPU code, using LLVM, and its AMDGPU backend that was upstreamed, although there is still research on such enhanced modularity with LLVM MLIR.

== Programming abilities ==
ROCm as a stack ranges from the kernel driver to the end-user applications. AMD has introductory videos about AMD GCN hardware, and ROCm programming via its learning portal.

One of the best technical introductions about the stack and ROCm/HIP programming, remains, to date, to be found on Reddit.

== Hardware support ==
ROCm is primarily targeted at discrete professional GPUs, but consumer GPUs and APUs of the same architecture as a supported professional GPU are known to work with ROCm. For example, all professional GPUs of the RDNA 2 architecture are officially supported by ROCm 5.x; users report that Consumer RDNA2 units such as the Radeon 6800M APU and the Radeon 6700XT GPU also work.

=== Consumer-grade GPUs ===
| Name of GPU series | Southern Islands | Sea Islands | Volcanic Islands | Arctic Islands/Polaris | Vega | Navi 1X | Navi 2X | Navi 3X | Navi 4X |
|---|---|---|---|---|---|---|---|---|---|
| Released | Jan 2012 | Sep 2013 | Jun 2015 | Jun 2016 | Jun 2017 | Jul 2019 | Nov 2020 | Dec 2022 | Jan 2025 |
| Marketing Name | Radeon HD 7000 | Radeon Rx 200 | Radeon Rx 300 | Radeon RX 400/500 | Radeon RX Vega/Radeon VII(7 nm) | Radeon RX 5000 | Radeon RX 6000 | Radeon RX 7000 | Radeon RX 9000 |
| AMD support | No | | | Current | | | | | |
| Instruction set | GCN instruction set | | | | | RDNA instruction set | | | |
| Microarchitecture | GCN 1st gen | GCN 2nd gen | GCN 3rd gen | GCN 4th gen | GCN 5th gen | RDNA | RDNA 2 | RDNA 3 | RDNA 4 |
| Type | Unified shader model | | | | | | | | |
| ROCm | No | | | need env var in 5.x | dropped in 6.x | Yes (Note: Navi 1.x support in rocBLAS was broken until version 6.1. Before version 5.3 an environmental variable could be used to force the use of gfx1030 code on these GPUs for some functionality, but version 5.3 caused gfx1030 code to no longer run on gfx1010 GPUs.) | Yes | | |
| OpenCL | 1.2 (on Linux: 1.1 (no Image support) with Mesa 3D) | 2.0 (Adrenalin driver on Win7+) (on Linux: 1.1 (no Image support) with Mesa 3D, 2.0 with AMD drivers or AMD ROCm) | | | | 2.0 | 2.1 | | |
| Vulkan | 1.0 (Win 7+ or Mesa 17+) | 1.2 (Adrenalin 20.1, Linux Mesa 3D 20.0) | | | | | | 1.3 | |
| Shader model | 5.1 | 5.1; 6.3 | | | 6.4 | | 6.5 | 6.7 | |
| OpenGL | 4.6 (on Linux: 4.6 (Mesa 3D 20.0)) | | | | | | | | |
| Direct3D | 11 (11_1); 12 (11_1) | 11 (12_0); 12 (12_0) | | | 11 (12_1); 12 (12_1) | | 11 (12_1); 12 (12_2) | | |
| /drm/amdgpu (Note: DRM (Direct Rendering Manager) is a component of the Linux kernel.) | Experimental | | Yes | | | | | | |

== Software ecosystem ==
=== Machine learning ===
Various deep learning frameworks have a ROCm backend:

- PyTorch
- TensorFlow
- ONNX
- MXNet
- CuPy
- MIOpen
- Caffe
- Iree (which uses LLVM Multi-Level Intermediate Representation (MLIR))
- llama.cpp

=== Supercomputing ===
ROCm is gaining significant traction in the top 500. ROCm is used with the Exascale supercomputers El Capitan and Frontier.

Some related software is to be found at AMD Infinity hub.

=== Other acceleration and graphics interoperation ===
As of version 3.0, Blender can use HIP compute kernels for its renderer cycles.

=== Other languages ===
==== Julia ====
Julia has the AMDGPU.jl package, which integrates with LLVM and selects components of the ROCm stack. Instead of compiling code through HIP, AMDGPU.jl uses Julia's compiler to generate LLVM IR directly, which is later consumed by LLVM to generate native device code. AMDGPU.jl uses ROCr's HSA implementation to upload native code onto the device and execute it, similar to how HIP loads its own generated device code.

AMDGPU.jl also supports integration with ROCm's rocBLAS (for BLAS), rocRAND (for random number generation), and rocFFT (for FFTs). Future integration with rocALUTION, rocSOLVER, MIOpen, and certain other ROCm libraries is planned.

=== Software distribution ===
==== Official ====
Installation instructions are provided for Linux and Windows in the official AMD ROCm documentation. ROCm software is currently spread across several public GitHub repositories. Within the main public meta-repository, there is an XML manifest for each official release: using git-repo, a version control tool built on top of Git, is the recommended way to synchronize with the stack locally.

AMD starts distributing containerized applications for ROCm, notably scientific research applications gathered under AMD Infinity Hub.

AMD itself distributes packages tailored to various Linux distributions.

==== Third-party ====
There is a growing third-party ecosystem packaging ROCm.

Linux distributions are officially packaging (natively) ROCm, with various degrees of advancement: Arch Linux, Gentoo, Debian, Fedora , GNU Guix, and NixOS.

There are Spack packages.

== Components ==
There is one kernel-space component, ROCk, and the rest – there are roughly a hundred components in the stack – is made of user-space modules.

The unofficial typographic policy is to use: uppercase ROC, lowercase following for low-level libraries, i.e. ROCt, and the contrary for user-facing libraries, i.e. rocBLAS.

AMD is active developing with the LLVM community, but upstreaming is not instantaneous, and as of January 2022, is still lagging. AMD still officially packages various LLVM forks for parts that are not yet upstreamed – compiler optimizations destined to remain proprietary, debug support, OpenMP offloading, etc.

=== Low-level ===
==== ROCm – Device libraries ====
Support libraries implemented as LLVM bitcode. These provide various utilities and functions for math operations, atomics, queries for launch parameters, on-device kernel launch, etc.

==== ROCt – Thunk ====
The thunk is responsible for all the thinking and queuing that goes into the stack.

==== ROCr – Runtime ====
The ROC runtime is a set of APIs/libraries that allows the launch of compute kernels by host applications. It is AMD's implementation of the HSA runtime API. It is different from the ROC Common Language Runtime.

==== ROCm – CompilerSupport ====
ROCm code object manager is in charge of interacting with LLVM intermediate representation.

=== Mid-level ===
==== ROCclr Common Language Runtime ====
The common language runtime is an indirection layer adapting calls to ROCr on Linux and PAL on windows. It used to be able to route between different compilers, like the HSAIL-compiler. It is now being absorbed by the upper indirection layers (HIP and OpenCL).

==== OpenCL ====
ROCm ships its installable client driver (ICD) loader and an OpenCL implementation bundled together. As of January 2022, ROCm 4.5.2 ships OpenCL 2.2, and is lagging behind competition.

==== HIP – Heterogeneous Interface for Portability ====
The AMD implementation for its GPUs is called HIPAMD. There is also a CPU implementation] mostly for demonstration purposes.

==== HIPCC ====
HIP builds a HIPCC compiler that either wraps Clang and compiles with LLVM open AMDGPU backend, or redirects to the NVIDIA compiler.

==== HIPIFY ====
HIPIFY is a source-to-source compiling tool. It translates CUDA to HIP and reverse, either using a Clang-based tool, or a sed-like Perl script.

==== GPUFORT ====
Like HIPIFY, GPUFORT is a tool compiling source code into other third-generation-language sources, allowing users to migrate from CUDA Fortran to HIP Fortran. It is also in the repertoire of research projects, even more so.

=== High-level ===
ROCm high-level libraries are usually consumed directly by application software, such as machine learning frameworks. Most of the following libraries are in the General Matrix Multiply (GEMM) category, which GPU architecture excels at.

The majority of these user-facing libraries comes in dual-form: hip for the indirection layer that can route to Nvidia hardware, and roc for the AMD implementation.

==== rocBLAS / hipBLAS ====
rocBLAS and hipBLAS are central in high-level libraries, it is the AMD implementation for Basic Linear Algebra Subprograms. It uses the library Tensile privately.

==== rocSOLVER / hipSOLVER ====
This pair of libraries constitutes the LAPACK implementation for ROCm and is strongly coupled to rocBLAS.

=== Utilities ===
- ROCm developer tools: Debug, tracer, profiler, System Management Interface, Validation suite, Cluster management.
- GPUOpen tools: GPU analyzer, memory visualizer...
- External tools: radeontop (TUI overview)

== Comparison with competitors ==
ROCm competes with other GPU computing stacks: Nvidia CUDA and Intel OneAPI.

=== Nvidia CUDA ===
Nvidia's CUDA is closed-source, whereas AMD ROCm is open source. There is open-source software built on top of the closed-source CUDA, for instance RAPIDS.

CUDA is able to run on consumer GPUs, whereas ROCm support is mostly offered for professional hardware such as AMD Instinct and AMD Radeon Pro.

Nvidia provides a C/C++-centered frontend and its Parallel Thread Execution (PTX) LLVM GPU backend as the Nvidia CUDA Compiler (NVCC).

=== Intel OneAPI ===
All the oneAPI corresponding libraries are published on its GitHub Page.

==== Unified Acceleration Foundation (UXL) ====
Unified Acceleration Foundation (UXL) is a new technology consortium that are working on the continuation of the OneAPI initiative, with the goal to create a new open standard accelerator software ecosystem, related open standards and specification projects through Working Groups and Special Interest Groups (SIGs). The goal will compete with Nvidia's CUDA. The main companies behind it are Intel, Google, Arm, Qualcomm, Samsung, Imagination, and VMware.

== See also ==
- AMD Software – a general overview of AMD's drivers, APIs, and development endeavors.
- GPUOpen – AMD's complementary graphics stack
- AMD Radeon Software – AMD's software distribution channel
