= Radeon 300 series =

Series of video cards

- Release date: June 16, 2015; 10 years ago
- Manufactured by: TSMC
- Codename: Caribbean Islands; Sea Islands; Volcanic Islands
- Architecture: GCN 1st gen GCN 2nd gen GCN 3rd gen
- Transistors: 690M (Exo) 28 nm; 950M (Oland) 28 nm; 1.500M (Cape Verde) 28 nm; 1.550M (Meso) 28 nm; 2.080M (Bonaire) 28 nm; 2.800M (Pitcairn) 28 nm; 5.000M (Tonga) 28 nm; 6.200M (Grenada) 28 nm; 8.900M (Fiji) 28 nm
- Fabrication process: 28 nm

Cards
- Entry-level: Radeon R5 310; Radeon R5 330; Radeon R5 340; Radeon R5 340X; Radeon R7 340; Radeon R7 350; Radeon R7 350X
- Mid-range: Radeon R7 360; Radeon R7 370; Radeon R9 360; Radeon R9 370; Radeon R9 370X; Radeon R9 380; Radeon R9 380X
- High-end: Radeon R9 390; Radeon R9 390X
- Enthusiast: Radeon R9 390 X2; Radeon R9 Nano; Radeon R9 Fury; Radeon R9 Fury X Radeon Pro Duo

API support
- Direct3D: Direct3D 12.0 (feature level 12_0) Shader Model 6.5
- OpenCL: OpenCL 2.1
- OpenGL: OpenGL 4.6
- Vulkan: Vulkan 1.2 (Windows) Vulkan 1.3 (Linux) SPIR-V

History
- Predecessor: Radeon 200 series
- Successor: Radeon 400 series

Support status
- Unsupported

The Radeon 300 series is a series of graphics processors developed by AMD. These GPUs are based on the Graphics Core Next (GCN) microarchitecture, and are produced with TSMC's 28 nm process.

The series introduces two new GPUs, "Tonga" and "Fiji", based on GCN 3 microarchitecture; various older GPUs are also rebranded under the series. The Tonga was first introduced with Radeon R9 285 graphics card, and Fiji first with R9 Fury X. Fiji is the first GPU to utilize High Bandwidth Memory (HBM), a type of dynamic random-access memory (DRAM) co-developed between AMD and SK Hynix. Non-Fiji GPUs feature the traditional GDDR5 memory. AMD released the R9 390X on June 18, 2015, the flagship Fury X on June 24, and the Radeon Pro Duo with two Fiji GPUs on a single card, on April 26, 2016.

== Microarchitecture and instruction set ==
The R9 380/X along with the R9 Fury & Nano series were AMD's first cards (after the earlier R9 285) to use the third iteration of their GCN instruction set and micro-architecture. The other cards in the series feature first and second gen iterations of GCN. The table below details which GCN-generation each chip belongs to.

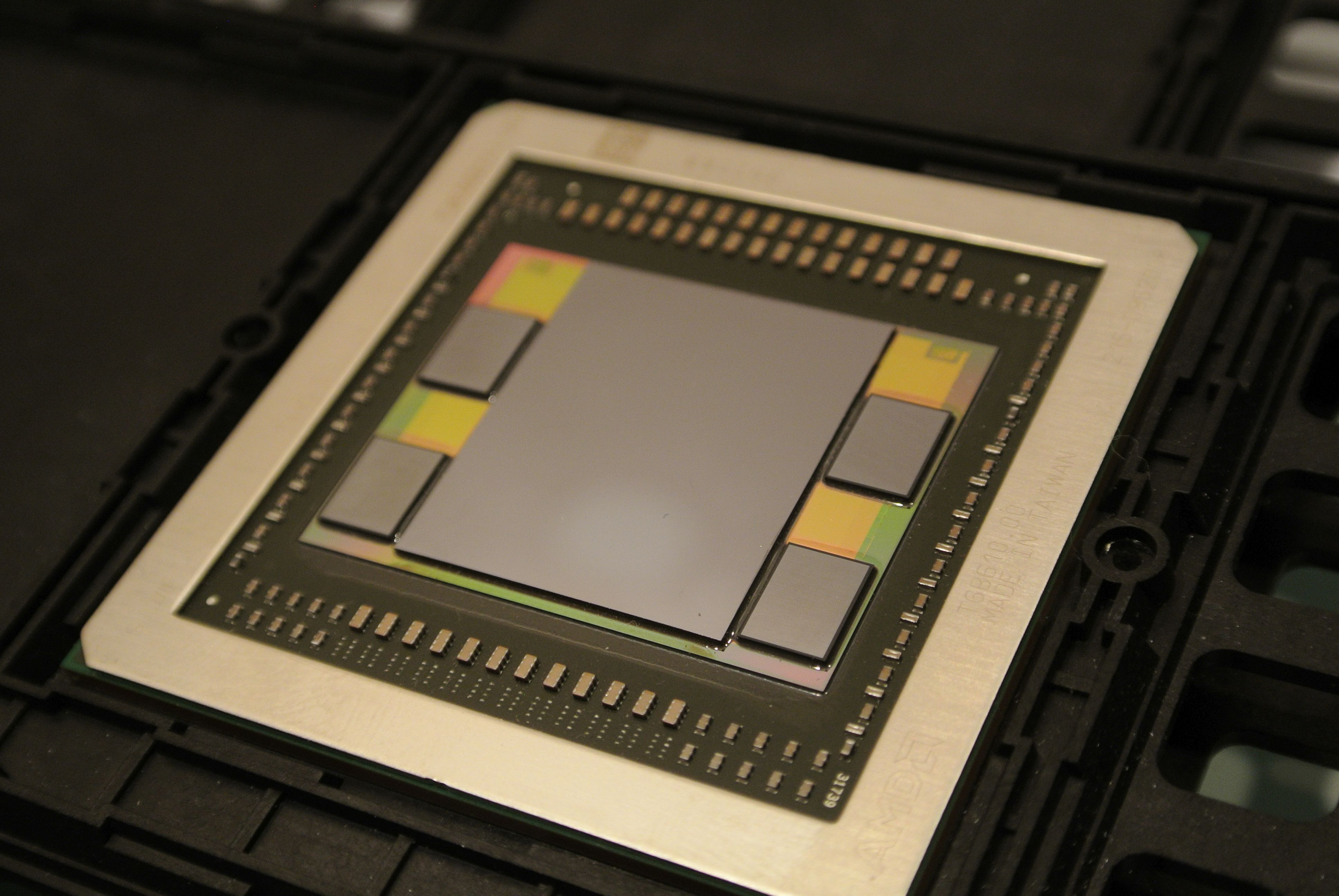
AMD Fiji with HBM

== Ancillary ASICs ==
Ancillary ASICs present on the chips are being developed independently of the core architecture and have their own version name schemes.

=== Multi-monitor support ===
The AMD Eyefinity branded on-die display controllers were introduced in September 2009 in the Radeon HD 5000 series and have been present in all products since.

=== AMD TrueAudio ===
AMD TrueAudio was introduced with the AMD Radeon RX 200 series for audio processing. It is only found on the dies of GCN 2nd gen and later products.

=== Video acceleration ===
AMD's SIP core for video acceleration, Unified Video Decoder and Video Coding Engine, are found on all GPUs and are supported by AMD Catalyst and by the open-source Radeon graphics driver.

=== Frame limiter ===
A new feature to the lineup allows users to reduce power consumption by not rendering unnecessary frames. It is user configurable.

=== LiquidVR support ===
LiquidVR is a technology that improves the smoothness of virtual reality. The aim is to reduce latency between hardware so that the hardware can keep up with the user's head movement, eliminating the motion sickness. A particular focus is on dual GPU setups where each GPU now renders for one eye individually of the display.

=== Virtual super resolution support ===
Originally introduced with the previous generation R9 285 and R9 290 series graphics cards, this feature allows users to run games with higher image quality by rendering frames at above native resolution. Each frame is then downsampled to native resolution. This process is an alternative to supersampling which is not supported by all games. Virtual super resolution is similar to Dynamic Super Resolution, a feature available on competing Nvidia graphics cards, but trades flexibility for increased performance.

=== OpenCL (API) ===
OpenCL accelerates many scientific Software Packages against CPU up to factor 10 or 100 and more. Open CL 1.0 to 1.2 are supported for all chips with Terascale and GCN Architecture. OpenCL 2.0 is supported with GCN 2nd Gen. and higher. For OpenCL 2.1 and 2.2, only driver updates are necessary with OpenCL 2.0 conformant Cards.

=== Vulkan (API) ===
Vulkan 1.0 is supported for all GCN architecture cards. Vulkan 1.2 requires GCN 2nd gen or higher with the Adrenalin 20.1 and Linux Mesa 20.0 drivers and newer.

== Chipset tables ==
=== Desktop models ===
Model (Codename)	Release Date & Price	Architecture (Fab)	Transistors Die Size	Core		Fillrate (Note: Boost values (if available) are stated below the base value in italic.) (Note: Texture fillrate is calculated as the number of Texture Mapping Units multiplied by the base (or boost) core clock speed.) (Note: Pixel fillrate is calculated as the number of Render Output Units multiplied by the base (or boost) core clock speed.)		Processing power (Note: Precision performance is calculated from the base (or boost) core clock speed based on a FMA operation. Double precision performance of Hawaii cards is 1/8 of single precision performance, for the other it is 1/16 of single precision performance.) (GFLOPS)		Memory				TBP (W)	Bus interface
Model (Codename)	Release Date & Price	Architecture (Fab)	Transistors Die Size	Config (Note: Unified Shaders : Texture Mapping Units : Render Output Units)	Clock (MHz)	Texture (GT/s)	Pixel (GP/s)	Single	Double	Size (MiB)	Bus type & width	Clock (MT/s)	Band- width (GB/s)	TBP (W)	Bus interface
Radeon R5 330 (Oland Pro)	May 2015; OEM	GCN 1^{st} gen (28 nm)	1040×10^{6} 90 mm^{2}	320:20:8	Unknown; 855	17.1	6.84	547.2	34.2	1024; 2048	DDR3; 128-bit	1800	28.8	30	PCIe 3.0 x4 x8 ×16
Radeon R5 340 (Oland XT)	May 2015; OEM	GCN 1^{st} gen (28 nm)	1040×10^{6} 90 mm^{2}	384:24:8	Unknown; 825	19.8	6.6	633.6	39.6	1024; 2048	DDR3; GDDR5; 128-bit	1800; 4500	28.8; 72	75	PCIe 3.0 x4 x8 ×16
Radeon R7 340 (Oland XT)	May 2015; OEM	GCN 1^{st} gen (28 nm)	1040×10^{6} 90 mm^{2}	384:24:8	730; 780	17.5; 18.7	5.8; 6.2	560.6; 599	32.7; 35	1024; 2048; 4096	DDR3; GDDR5; 128-bit	1800; 4500	28.8; 72	75	PCIe 3.0 x4 x8 ×16
Radeon R5 340X (Oland XT)	May 2015; OEM	GCN 1^{st} gen (28 nm)	1040×10^{6} 90 mm^{2}	384:24:8	1050	25.2	8.4	806	50.4	2048	DDR3; 64-bit	2000	16	65	PCIe 3.0 x4 x8 ×16
Radeon R7 350 (Oland XT)	May 2015; OEM	GCN 1^{st} gen (28 nm)	1040×10^{6} 90 mm^{2}	384:24:8	1000; 1050	24; 25.2	8; 8.4	768; 806.4	48; 50.4	1024; 2048	DDR3; GDDR5; 128-bit	1800; 4500	28.8; 72	75	PCIe 3.0 x4 x8 ×16
Radeon R7 350 (Cape Verde XTL)	February 2016 $89 USD	GCN 1^{st} gen (28 nm)	1500×10^{6} 123 mm^{2}	512:32:16	925	29.6	14.8	947.2	59.2	2048	GDDR5; 128-bit	4500	72	75	PCIe 3.0 x4 x8 ×16
Radeon R7 350X (Oland XT)	May 2015; OEM	GCN 1^{st} gen (28 nm)	1040×10^{6} 90 mm^{2}	384:24:8	1050	25.2	8.4	806	50.4	4096	DDR3; 128-bit	2000	32	30	PCIe 3.0 x4 x8 ×16
Radeon R7 360 (Bonaire Pro)	June 2015 $109 USD	GCN 2^{nd} gen (28 nm)	2080×10^{6} 160 mm^{2}	768:48:16	1050	50.4	16.8	1612.8	100.8	2048	GDDR5; 128-bit	6500	104	100	PCIe 3.0 x4 x8 ×16
Radeon R9 360 (Bonaire Pro)	May 2015; OEM	GCN 2^{nd} gen (28 nm)	2080×10^{6} 160 mm^{2}	768:48:16	1000; 1050	48; 50.4	16; 16.8	1536; 1612.8	96; 100.8	2048	GDDR5; 128-bit	6500	104	85	PCIe 3.0 x4 x8 ×16
Radeon R7 370 (Pitcairn Pro)	June 2015 $149 USD	GCN 1^{st} gen (28 nm)	2800×10^{6} 212 mm^{2}	1024:64:32	975	62.4	31.2	1996.8	124.8	2048; 4096	GDDR5; 256-bit	5600	179.2	110	PCIe 3.0 x4 x8 ×16
Radeon R9 370 (Pitcairn Pro)	May 2015; OEM	GCN 1^{st} gen (28 nm)	2800×10^{6} 212 mm^{2}	1024:64:32	950; 975	60.8; 62.4	30.4; 31.2	1945.6; 1996.8	121.6; 124.8	2048; 4096	GDDR5; 256-bit	5600	179.2	150	PCIe 3.0 x4 x8 ×16
Radeon R9 370X (Pitcairn XT)	August 2015 $179 USD	GCN 1^{st} gen (28 nm)	2800×10^{6} 212 mm^{2}	1280:80:32	1000	80	32	2560	160	2048; 4096	GDDR5; 256-bit	5600	179.2	185	PCIe 3.0 x4 x8 ×16
Radeon R9 380 (Tonga Pro)	May 2015; OEM	GCN 3^{rd} gen (28 nm)	5000×10^{6} 359 mm^{2}	1792:112:32	918	102.8	29.4	3290	206.6	4096	GDDR5; 256-bit	5500	176	190	PCIe 3.0 x4 x8 ×16
Radeon R9 380 (Tonga Pro)	June 2015 $199 USD	GCN 3^{rd} gen (28 nm)	5000×10^{6} 359 mm^{2}	1792:112:32	970	108.6	31.0	3476.5	217.3	2048; 4096	GDDR5; 256-bit	5700	182.4 (Note: The R9 380 utilizes loss-less color compression which can increase effective memory performance (relative to GCN 1^{st} gen and 2^{nd} gen cards) in certain situations.)	190	PCIe 3.0 x4 x8 ×16
Radeon R9 380X (Tonga XT)	November 2015 $229 USD	GCN 3^{rd} gen (28 nm)	5000×10^{6} 359 mm^{2}	2048:128:32	970	124.2	31.0	3973.1	248.3	4096	GDDR5; 256-bit	5700	182.4	190	PCIe 3.0 x4 x8 ×16
Radeon R9 390 (Grenada Pro)	June 2015 $329 USD	GCN 2^{nd} gen (28 nm)	6200×10^{6} 438 mm^{2}	2560:160:64	1000	160	64	5120	640	8192	GDDR5; 512-bit	6000	384	275	PCIe 3.0 x4 x8 ×16
Radeon R9 390X (Grenada XT)	June 2015 $429 USD	GCN 2^{nd} gen (28 nm)	6200×10^{6} 438 mm^{2}	2816:176:64	1050	184.8	67.2	5913.6	739.2	8192	GDDR5; 512-bit	6000	384	275	PCIe 3.0 x4 x8 ×16
Radeon R9 Fury (Fiji Pro)	July 2015 $549 USD	GCN 3^{rd} gen (28 nm)	8900×10^{6} 596 mm^{2}	3584:224:64	1000	224	64	7168	448	4096	HBM; 4096-bit	1000	512	275	PCIe 3.0 x4 x8 ×16
Radeon R9 Nano (Fiji XT)	August 2015 $649 USD	GCN 3^{rd} gen (28 nm)	8900×10^{6} 596 mm^{2}	4096:256:64	1000	256	64	8192	512	4096	HBM; 4096-bit	1000	512	175	PCIe 3.0 x4 x8 ×16
Radeon R9 Fury X (Fiji XT)	June 2015 $649 USD	GCN 3^{rd} gen (28 nm)	8900×10^{6} 596 mm^{2}	4096:256:64	1050	268.8	67.2	8601.6	537.6	4096	HBM; 4096-bit	1000	512	275	PCIe 3.0 x4 x8 ×16
Radeon Pro Duo (Fiji XT)	April 2016 $1499 USD	GCN 3^{rd} gen (28 nm)	2× 8900×10^{6} 2× 596 mm^{2}	2× 4096:256:64	1000	512	128	16384	1024	2× 4096	HBM; 4096-bit	1000	2× 512	350	PCIe 3.0 x4 x8 ×16
Model (Codename)	Release Date & Price	Architecture (Fab)	Transistors Die Size	Config	Clock (MHz)	Texture (GT/s)	Pixel (GP/s)	Single	Double	Size (MiB)	Bus type & width	Clock (MT/s)	Band- width (GB/s)	TBP (W)	Bus interface
Model (Codename)	Release Date & Price	Architecture (Fab)	Transistors Die Size	Core		Fillrate		Processing power (GFLOPS)		Memory				TBP (W)	Bus interface

=== Mobile models ===
Model (Codename)	Launch	Architecture (Fab)	Core		Fillrate (Note: Boost values (if available) are stated below the base value in italic.) (Note: Texture fillrate is calculated as the number of Texture Mapping Units multiplied by the base (or boost) core clock speed.) (Note: Pixel fillrate is calculated as the number of Render Output Units multiplied by the base (or boost) core clock speed.)		Processing power (Note: Precision performance is calculated from the base (or boost) core clock speed based on a FMA operation.) (GFLOPS)	Memory				TDP
Model (Codename)	Launch	Architecture (Fab)	Config (Note: Unified Shaders : Texture Mapping Units : Render Output Units)	Clock (MHz)	Texture (GT/s)	Pixel (GP/s)	Processing power (GFLOPS)	Size (GiB)	Bus type & width	Clock (MT/s)	Band- width (GB/s)	TDP
Radeon R5 M330 (Exo Pro)	2015	GCN 1^{st} gen (28 nm)	320:20:8	Unknown; 1030	8.2	20.6	659.2	2; 4	DDR3; 64-bit	1800; 2000	14.4; 16	18 W
Radeon R5 M335 (Exo Pro)	2015	GCN 1^{st} gen (28 nm)	320:20:8	Unknown; 1070	8.6	21.4	684.8	2; 4	DDR3; 64-bit	2200	17.6	Unknown
Radeon R7 M360 (Meso XT)	2015	GCN 1^{st} gen (28 nm)	384:24:8	Unknown; 1125	9	27	864	2; 4	DDR3; 64-bit	2000	16	Unknown
Radeon R9 M365X (Strato Pro)	2015	GCN 1^{st} gen (28 nm)	640:40:16	Unknown; 925	14.8	37	1184	4	GDDR5; 128-bit	4500	72	50 W
Radeon R9 M370X (Strato Pro)	May 2015	GCN 1^{st} gen (28 nm)	640:40:16	800	12.8	32	1024	2	GDDR5; 128-bit	4500	72	40–45 W
Radeon R9 M375 (Strato Pro)	2015	GCN 1^{st} gen (28 nm)	640:40:16	Unknown; 1015	16.2	40.6	1299.2	4	GDDR5; 128-bit	4400	35.2	Unknown
Radeon R9 M375X (Strato Pro)	2015	GCN 1^{st} gen (28 nm)	640:40:16	Unknown; 1015	16.2	40.6	1299.2	4	GDDR5; 128-bit	4500	72	Unknown
Radeon R9 M380 (Strato Pro)	2015	GCN 1^{st} gen (28 nm)	640:40:16	Unknown; 900	14.4	36	1152	4	GDDR5; 128-bit	6000	96	Unknown
Radeon R9 M385X (Strato)	2015	GCN 2^{nd} gen (28 nm)	896:56:16	Unknown; 1100	17.6	61.6	1971.2	4	GDDR5; 128-bit	6000	96	~75 W
Radeon R9 M390 (Pitcairn)	June 2015	GCN 1^{st} gen (28 nm)	1024:64:32	Unknown; 958	30.7	61.3	1962	2	GDDR5; 256-bit	5460	174.7	~100 W
Radeon R9 M390X (Amethyst XT)	2015	GCN 3^{rd} gen (28 nm)	2048:128:32	Unknown; 723	23.1	92.5	2961.4	4	GDDR5; 256-bit	5000	160	125 W
Radeon R9 M395 (Amethyst Pro)	2015	GCN 3^{rd} gen (28 nm)	1792:112:32	Unknown; 834	26.6	93.4	2989.0	2	GDDR5; 256-bit	5460	174.7	125 W
Radeon R9 M395X Amethyst XT)	2015	GCN 3^{rd} gen (28 nm)	2048:128:32	Unknown; 909	29.1	116.3	3723.3	4	GDDR5; 256-bit	5460	174.7	125 W

== Radeon Feature Matrix ==
The following table shows features of AMD/ATI's GPUs (see also: List of AMD graphics processing units).

Name of GPU series	Wonder	Mach	3D Rage	Rage Pro	Rage 128	R100	R200	R300	R400	R500	R600	RV670	R700	Evergreen	Northern Islands		Southern Islands	Sea Islands	Volcanic Islands	Arctic Islands/Polaris	Vega	Navi 1x	Navi 2x	Navi 3x	Navi 4x
Released	1986	1991	Apr; 1996	Mar; 1997	Aug; 1998	Apr; 2000	Aug; 2001	Sep; 2002	May; 2004	Oct; 2005	May; 2007	Nov; 2007	Jun; 2008	Sep; 2009	Oct; 2010	Dec; 2010	Jan; 2012	Sep; 2013	Jun; 2015	Jun 2016, Apr 2017, Aug 2019	Jun 2017, Feb 2019	Jul; 2019	Nov; 2020	Dec; 2022	Feb; 2025
Marketing Name	Wonder	Mach	3D; Rage	Rage; Pro	Rage; 128	Radeon; 7000	Radeon; 8000	Radeon; 9000	Radeon; X700/X800	Radeon; X1000	Radeon; HD 2000	Radeon; HD 3000	Radeon; HD 4000	Radeon; HD 5000	Radeon; HD 6000		Radeon; HD 7000	Radeon; 200	Radeon; 300	Radeon; 400/500/600	Radeon; RX Vega, Radeon VII	Radeon; RX 5000	Radeon; RX 6000	Radeon; RX 7000	Radeon; RX 9000
AMD support	Ended																			Current					
Kind	2D		3D																						
Instruction set architecture	Not publicly known										TeraScale instruction set						GCN instruction set					RDNA instruction set			
Microarchitecture	Not publicly known					GFX1		GFX2			TeraScale 1 (VLIW5) (GFX3)			TeraScale 2 (VLIW5) (GFX4)	TeraScale 2 (VLIW5) up to 68xx (GFX4)	TeraScale 3 (VLIW4) in 69xx (GFX5)	GCN 1st gen (GFX6)	GCN 2nd gen (GFX7)	GCN 3rd gen (GFX8)	GCN 4th gen (GFX8)	GCN 5th gen (GFX9)	RDNA (GFX10.1)	RDNA 2 (GFX10.3)	RDNA 3 (GFX11)	RDNA 4 (GFX12)
Type	Fixed pipeline (Note: The Radeon R100 Series has programmable pixel shaders, but do not fully comply with DirectX 8 or Pixel Shader 1.0. See article on R100's pixel shaders.)						Programmable pixel & vertex pipelines				Unified shader model														
Direct3D	—N/a		5.0	6.0		7.0	8.1	9.0; 11 (9_2)	9.0b 11 (9_2)	9.0c 11 (9_3)	10.0; 11 (10_0)	10.1; 11 (10_1)		11 (11_0)			11 (11_1); 12 (11_1)	11 (12_0); 12 (12_0)			11 (12_1); 12 (12_1)		11 (12_1); 12 (12_2)		
Shader model	—N/a						1.4	2.0+	2.0b	3.0	4.0	4.1		5.0			5.1	5.1; 6.5			6.7				6.8
OpenGL	—N/a			1.1	1.2	1.3		1.5 (Note: R300, R400 and R500 based cards do not fully comply with OpenGL 2+ as the hardware does not support all types of non-power of two (NPOT) textures.)			3.3			4.5 (Windows), 4.6 (Linux Mesa 25.2+)			4.6 (Note: OpenGL 4+ compliance requires supporting FP64 shaders and these are emulated on some TeraScale chips using 32-bit hardware.)								
Vulkan	—N/a															1.1 (Note: Vulkan support is theoretically possible but has not been implemented in a stable driver.)	1.3 (Note: Vulkan support in Linux relies on the amdgpu kernel driver which is incomplete and not enabled by default for GFX6 and GFX7.)		1.4						
OpenCL	—N/a										Close to Metal		1.1 (not supported by Mesa)	1.2+ (on Linux: 1.1+ (no Image support on Clover, with Rusticl) with Mesa, 1.2+ on GCN 1.Gen)				2.0+ (Adrenalin driver on Win 7+) (on Linux ROCm, Mesa 1.2+ (no support in Clover, only Rusticl, Mesa, 2.0+ and 3.0 with AMD drivers or AMD ROCm), 5th gen: 2.2 win 10+ and Linux RocM 5.0+				2.2+ and 3.0 Windows 8.1+ and Linux ROCm 5.0+ (Mesa Rusticl 1.2+ and 3.0 (2.1+ and 2.2+))			
HSA / ROCm	—N/a																Yes					?			
Video decoding ASIC	—N/a										Avivo/UVD	UVD+	UVD 2	UVD 2.2	UVD 3		UVD 4	UVD 4.2	UVD 5.0 or 6.0	UVD 6.3	UVD 7 (Note: The UVD and VCE were replaced by the Video Core Next (VCN) ASIC in the Raven Ridge APU implementation of Vega.)	VCN 2.0	VCN 3.0	VCN 4.0	VCN 5.0
Video encoding ASIC	—N/a																VCE 1.0	VCE 2.0	VCE 3.0 or 3.1	VCE 3.4	VCE 4.0	VCN 2.0	VCN 3.0	VCN 4.0	VCN 5.0
Fluid Motion (Note: Video processing for video frame rate interpolation technique. In Windows it works as a DirectShow filter in your player. In Linux, there is no support on the part of drivers and / or community.)	No																	Yes				No		?	
Power saving	?										PowerPlay				PowerTune		PowerTune & ZeroCore Power					?			
TrueAudio	—N/a																	Via dedicated DSP		Via shaders					
FreeSync	—N/a																	1; 2							
HDCP (Note: To play protected video content, it also requires card, operating system, driver, and application support. A compatible HDCP display is also needed for this. HDCP is mandatory for the output of certain audio formats, placing additional constraints on the multimedia setup.)	—N/a										?							1.4		2.2		2.3			
PlayReady	—N/a																			3.0	No	3.0			
Supported displays (Note: More displays may be supported with native DisplayPort connections, or splitting the maximum resolution between multiple monitors with active converters.)						1–2	2							2–6								?			4
Max. resolution	?													2–6 × 2560×1600			2–6 × 4096×2160 @ 30 Hz			2–6 × 5120×2880 @ 60 Hz	3 × 7680×4320 @ 60 Hz	7680×4320 @ 60 Hz PowerColor		7680x4320 @165 Hz	7680x4320
/drm/radeon (Note: DRM (Direct Rendering Manager) is a component of the Linux kernel. AMDgpu is the Linux kernel module. Support in this table refers to the most current version.)						Yes													—N/a						
/drm/amdgpu	—N/a																	Optional	Yes						

== Graphics device drivers ==
=== Proprietary graphics device driver Catalyst ===
AMD Catalyst is being developed for Microsoft Windows and Linux. As of July 2014, other operating systems are not officially supported. This may be different for the AMD FirePro brand, which is based on identical hardware but features OpenGL-certified graphics device drivers.

AMD Catalyst supports all features advertised for the Radeon brand.

=== Free and open-source graphics device driver radeon ===
The free and open-source drivers are primarily developed on and for Linux, but have been ported to other operating systems as well. Each driver is composed out of five parts:

1. Linux kernel component DRM
2. Linux kernel component KMS driver: basically the device driver for the display controller
3. user-space component libDRM
4. user-space component in Mesa 3D
5. a special and distinct 2D graphics device driver for X.Org Server, which is finally about to be replaced by Glamor

The free and open-source radeon kernel driver supports most of the features implemented into the Radeon line of GPUs.

The radeon kernel driver is not reverse engineered, but based on documentation released by AMD. This driver still requires proprietary microcode to operate DRM functions and some GPUs may fail to launch the X server if not available.

=== Free and open-source graphics device driver amdgpu ===
This new kernel driver is directly supported and developed by AMD. It is available on various Linux distributions, and has been ported to some other operating systems as well. Only GCN GPUs are supported.

=== Proprietary graphics device driver AMDGPU-PRO ===
This new driver by AMD was still undergoing development in 2018, but could be used on a few supported Linux distributions already (AMD officially supports Ubuntu, RHEL/CentOS). The driver has been experimentally ported to ArchLinux and other distributions. AMDGPU-PRO is set to replace the previous AMD Catalyst driver and is based on the free and open source amdgpu kernel driver. Pre-GCN GPUs are not supported.

== See also ==
- Graphics Core Next
- AMD FirePro
- AMD FireMV
- AMD FireStream
- List of AMD graphics processing units
