= Radeon RX Vega series =

Series of GPUs by AMD

AMD Radeon RX Vega series
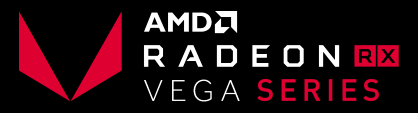
- Release date: August 14, 2017 (9 years ago)
- Codename: Vega
- Architecture: GCN 5th gen
- Transistors: 12.500M (Vega 10) 14 nm; 13.200M (Vega 20) 7 nm
- Fabrication process: Samsung/GloFo 14 nm (FinFET); TSMC 7 nm (FinFET)

Cards
- Entry-level: Radeon RX Vega 7 (IGPU); Radeon RX Vega 8 (IGPU); Radeon RX Vega 9 (IGPU); Radeon RX Vega 10 (IGPU); Radeon RX Vega 11 (IGPU)
- High-end: Radeon RX Vega 56; Radeon RX Vega 64; Radeon RX Vega 64 Liquid Cooled
- Enthusiast: Radeon VII

API support
- Direct3D: Direct3D (feature level 12_1); Shader Model 6.4
- OpenCL: OpenCL 2.0
- OpenGL: OpenGL 4.6
- Vulkan: Vulkan 1.3; SPIR-V

History
- Predecessor: Radeon 500 series
- Successor: Radeon RX 5000 series

Support status
- Supported, with less regular Windows driver update schedule

The Radeon RX Vega series is a series of graphics processors developed by AMD. These GPUs use the Graphics Core Next (GCN) 5th generation architecture, codenamed Vega, and are manufactured on 14 nm FinFET technology. They are developed by Samsung Electronics and licensed to GlobalFoundries. The series consists of desktop graphics cards and APUs aimed at desktops, mobile devices, and embedded applications.

The lineup was released on 14 August 2017. It included the RX Vega 56 and the RX Vega 64, priced at $399 and $499 respectively. These were followed by two mobile APUs, the Ryzen 2500U and Ryzen 2700U, in October 2017. February 2018 saw the release of two desktop APUs, the Ryzen 3 2200G and the Ryzen 5 2400G, and the Ryzen Embedded V1000 line of APUs. In September 2018 AMD announced several Vega APUs in their Athlon line of products. Later in January 2019, the Radeon VII was announced based on the 7nm FinFET node manufactured by TSMC.

== History ==
The Vega microarchitecture was AMD's high-end graphics cards line, and is the successor to the R9 300 series enthusiast Fury products. Partial specifications of the architecture and Vega 10 GPU were announced with the Radeon Instinct MI25 in December 2016. AMD later released the details of the Vega architecture.

== Announcement ==
Vega was originally announced at AMD's CES 2017 presentation on 5 January 2017, alongside the Zen line of CPUs.

== New features ==
Vega targets increased instructions per clock, higher clock speeds, and support for HBM2.

AMD's Vega has new memory hierarchy with high-bandwidth cache and its controller.

Support for HBM2 featuring double the bandwidth-per-pin over previous generation HBM. HBM2 allows for higher capacities with less than half the footprint of GDDR5 memory. Vega architecture is optimized for streaming very large datasets and can work with a variety of memory types with up to 512TB of virtual address space.

Primitive shader for improved geometry processing. Replaces vertex and geometry shaders in geometry processing pipelines with a more programmable single stage. The primitive shader stage is more efficient, introduces intelligent load balancing technologies and higher throughput.

NCU: The Vega GPU introduces the Next-Gen Compute Unit. Versatile architecture featuring flexible compute units that can natively process 8-bit, 16-bit, 32-bit or 64-bit operations in each clock cycle. And run at higher frequencies. Vega brings support for Rapid Packed Math, processing two half-precision (16-bit) in the same time as a single 32-bit floating-point operation. Up to 128 32-bit, 256 16-bit or 512 8-bit ops per clock are possible with the Vega architecture.

Draw Stream Binning Rasterizer designed for higher performance and power efficiency. It allows for "fetch once, shade once" of pixels through the use of a smart on-chip bin cache and early culling of pixels invisible in a final scene.

Vega bumps Direct3D feature level support from 12_0 to 12_1.

Vega's rasteriser brings hardware-acceleration support for Rasterizer Ordered Views and Conservative Rasterisation Tier 3.

== Products ==
=== RX Vega branded discrete graphics ===
Model (Code name)	Release Date & Price	Architecture & fab	Transistors & die size	Core		Fillrate (Note: Boost values (if available) are stated below the base value in italic.) (Note: Texture fillrate is calculated as the number of Texture Mapping Units multiplied by the base (or boost) core clock speed.) (Note: Pixel fillrate is calculated as the number of Render Output Units multiplied by the base (or boost) core clock speed.)		Processing power (Note: Precision performance is calculated from the base (or boost) core clock speed based on a FMA operation.) (GFLOPS)			Memory				TBP	Bus interface
Model (Code name)	Release Date & Price	Architecture & fab	Transistors & die size	Config (Note: Unified shaders : Texture mapping units : Render output units and Compute units (CU))	Clock (MHz)	Texture (GT/s)	Pixel (GP/s)	Half	Single	Double	Size (GB)	Bandwidth (GB/s)	Bus type & width	Clock (MT/s)	TBP	Bus interface
Radeon RX Vega 56 (Vega 10)	Aug 28, 2017 $399 USD	GCN 5 GloFo; 14LPP (Note: GlobalFoundries' 14 nm 14LPP FinFET process is second-sourced from Samsung Electronics.)	12.5×10^{9} 486 mm^{2}	3584:224:64; 56 CU	1156; 1471	258.9; 329.5	73.98; 94.14	16,572; 21,088	8,286; 10,544	517.9; 659.0	8	409.6	HBM2; 2048-bit	1600	210 W	PCIe 3.0 ×16
Radeon RX Vega 64 (Vega 10)	Aug 14, 2017 $499 USD	GCN 5 GloFo; 14LPP	12.5×10^{9} 486 mm^{2}	4096:256:64; 64 CU	1247; 1546	319.2; 395.8	79.81; 98.94	20,431; 25,330	10,215; 12,665	638.5; 791.6	8	483.8	HBM2; 2048-bit	1890	295 W	PCIe 3.0 ×16
Radeon RX Vega 64 Liquid (Vega 10)	Aug 14, 2017 $699 USD	GCN 5 GloFo; 14LPP	12.5×10^{9} 486 mm^{2}	4096:256:64; 64 CU	1406; 1677	359.9; 429.3	89.98; 107.3	23,036; 27,476	11,518; 13,738	719.9; 858.6	8	483.8	HBM2; 2048-bit	1890	345 W	PCIe 3.0 ×16

=== Radeon VII branded discrete graphics ===
Model (Code name)	Release Date & Price	Architecture & fab	Transistors & die size	Core		Fillrate (Note: Boost values (if available) are stated below the base value in italic.) (Note: Texture fillrate is calculated as the number of Texture Mapping Units multiplied by the base (or boost) core clock speed.) (Note: Pixel fillrate is calculated as the number of Render Output Units multiplied by the base (or boost) core clock speed.)		Processing power (Note: Precision performance is calculated from the base (or boost) core clock speed based on a FMA operation.) (GFLOPS)			Memory				TBP	Bus interface
Model (Code name)	Release Date & Price	Architecture & fab	Transistors & die size	Config (Note: Unified shaders : Texture mapping units : Render output units and Compute units (CU))	Clock (MHz)	Texture (GT/s)	Pixel (GP/s)	Half	Single	Double	Size (GB)	Bandwidth (GB/s)	Bus type & width	Clock (MT/s)	TBP	Bus interface
Radeon VII (Vega 20)	Feb 7, 2019 $699 USD	GCN 5 TSMC CLN7FF	13.23×10^{9} 331 mm^{2}	3840:240:64; 60 CU	1400; 1800	336.0; 420.0	89.60; 112.0	21,504; 27,648	10,752; 13,824	2,688; 3,459	16	1024	HBM2; 4096-bit	2000	300 W	PCIe 3.0 ×16

=== Workstation GPUs ===
Model (Code name)	Release date & price	Architecture & fab	Transistors & die size	Core		Fillrate (Note: Boost values (if available) are stated below the base value in italic.) (Note: Texture fillrate is calculated as the number of Texture Mapping Units multiplied by the base (or boost) core clock speed.) (Note: Pixel fillrate is calculated as the number of Render Output Units multiplied by the base (or boost) core clock speed.)		Processing power (Note: Precision performance is calculated from the base (or boost) core clock speed based on a FMA operation.) (GFLOPS)			Memory				TBP	Bus interface	Graphic output ports
Model (Code name)	Release date & price	Architecture & fab	Transistors & die size	Config (Note: Unified shaders : Texture mapping units : Render output units and Compute units (CU))	Clock (MHz)	Texture (GT/s)	Pixel (GP/s)	Half	Single	Double	Size (GB)	Bandwidth (GB/s)	Bus type & width	Clock (MT/s)	TBP	Bus interface	Graphic output ports
Radeon Vega Frontier Edition (Air-cooled) (Vega 10)	Jun 27, 2017 $999 USD	GCN 5 GloFo 14 nm	12.5×10^{9} 494 mm^{2}	4096:256:64; 64 CU	1382; 1600	353.8; 409.6	88.4; 102.4	22,643; 26,214	11,321; 13,107	707.6; 819.2	16	484	HBM2; 2048-bit	1890	300 W	PCIe 3.0 ×16	3× DP 1.4a 1× HDMI 2.0b
Radeon Vega Frontier Edition (Liquid-cooled) (Vega 10)	Jun 27, 2017 $1,499 USD	GCN 5 GloFo 14 nm	12.5×10^{9} 494 mm^{2}	4096:256:64; 64 CU	1382; 1600	353.8; 409.6	88.4; 102.4	22,643; 26,214	11,321; 13,107	707.6; 819.2	16	484	HBM2; 2048-bit	1890	375 W	PCIe 3.0 ×16	3× DP 1.4a 1× HDMI 2.0b

Model (Code name)	Release date & price	Architecture & fab	Transistors & die size	Core		Fillrate (Note: Boost values (if available) are stated below the base value in italic.) (Note: Texture fillrate is calculated as the number of Texture Mapping Units multiplied by the base (or boost) core clock speed.) (Note: Pixel fillrate is calculated as the number of Render Output Units multiplied by the base (or boost) core clock speed.)		Processing power (Note: Precision performance is calculated from the base (or boost) core clock speed based on a FMA operation.) (GFLOPS)			Memory				TBP	Bus interface	Graphic output ports
Model (Code name)	Release date & price	Architecture & fab	Transistors & die size	Config (Note: Unified shaders : Texture mapping units : Render output units and Compute units (CU))	Clock (MHz)	Texture (GT/s)	Pixel (GP/s)	Half	Single	Double	Size (GB)	Bandwidth (GB/s)	Bus type & width	Clock (MT/s)	TBP	Bus interface	Graphic output ports
Radeon Pro Vega II (Vega 20)	2019 $2,800 USD	GCN 5 TSMC 7 nm	13.23×10^{9} 331 mm^{2}	4096:256:64; 64 CU	1720	440.3	110.1	28,180	14,090	880	32	1024	HBM2; 4096-bit	2000	475 W	PCIe 3.0 ×16	4× Thunderbolt 3 (USB Type-C); 1× HDMI 2.0b
Radeon Pro Vega II Duo (Vega 20)	2019 $5,600 USD	GCN 5 TSMC 7 nm	13.23×10^{9} 331 mm^{2}	2× / 4096:256:64; 64 CU	1720	2× 440.3	2× 110.1	2× 28,180	2× 14,090	2× 880	2× 32	2× 1024	HBM2; 2× 4096-bit	2000	475 W	PCIe 3.0 ×16	4× Thunderbolt 3 (USB Type-C); 1× HDMI 2.0b

=== Mobile workstation GPUs ===
Model (Code name)	Release date	Architecture & fab	Transistors & die size	Core		Fillrate (Note: Boost values (if available) are stated below the base value in italic.) (Note: Texture fillrate is calculated as the number of Texture Mapping Units multiplied by the base (or boost) core clock speed.) (Note: Pixel fillrate is calculated as the number of Render Output Units multiplied by the base (or boost) core clock speed.)		Processing power (Note: Precision performance is calculated from the base (or boost) core clock speed based on a FMA operation.) (GFLOPS)			Memory				TDP	Bus interface
Model (Code name)	Release date	Architecture & fab	Transistors & die size	Config (Note: Unified shaders : Texture mapping units : Render output units and Compute units (CU))	Clock (MHz)	Texture (GT/s)	Pixel (GP/s)	Half	Single	Double	Size (GB)	Bandwidth (GB/s)	Bus type & width	Clock (MT/s)	TDP	Bus interface
Radeon Pro Vega 16 (Vega 12)	Nov 14, 2018	GCN 5 GloFo 14 nm	?	1024:64:32; 16 CU	815; 1190	52.16; 76.16	26.08; 38.08	3,338; 4,874	1,669; 2,437	104.3; 152.3	4	307.2	HBM2; 1024-bit	2400	50 W	PCIe 3.0 ×16
Radeon Pro Vega 20 (Vega 12)	Nov 14, 2018	GCN 5 GloFo 14 nm	?	1280:80:32; 20 CU	815; 1283	65.20; 102.6	26.08; 41.06	4,173; 6,569	2,086; 3,285	130.4; 205.3	4	189.4	HBM2; 1024-bit	1480	50 W	PCIe 3.0 ×16
Radeon Pro Vega 48 (Vega 10)	Mar 19, 2019	GCN 5 GloFo 14 nm	12.5×10^{9} 495 mm^{2}	3072:192:64; 48 CU	1200	230.4	76.80	14,746	7,373	460.8	8	402.4	HBM2; 2048-bit	1572	?	PCIe 3.0 ×16
Radeon Pro Vega 56 (Vega 10)	Aug 17, 2017	GCN 5 GloFo 14 nm	12.5×10^{9} 495 mm^{2}	3584:224:64; 56 CU	1138; 1250	254.9; 280.0	72.83; 80.00	16,314; 17,920	8,157; 8,960	509.8; 560.0	8	402.4	HBM2; 2048-bit	1572	120 W	PCIe 3.0 ×16
Radeon Pro Vega 64 (Vega 10)	Jun 17, 2017	GCN 5 GloFo 14 nm	12.5×10^{9} 495 mm^{2}	4096:256:64; 64 CU	1250; 1350	320.0; 345.6	80.00; 86.40	20,480; 22,118	10,240; 11,059	640.0; 691.2	16	402.4	HBM2; 2048-bit	1572	?	PCIe 3.0 ×16
Radeon Pro Vega 64X (Vega 10)	Mar 19, 2019	GCN 5 GloFo 14 nm	12.5×10^{9} 495 mm^{2}	4096:256:64; 64 CU	1250; 1468	320.0; 375.8	80.00; 93.95	20,480; 24,051	10,240; 12,026	640.0; 751.6	16	512.0	HBM2; 2048-bit	2000	?	PCIe 3.0 ×16

=== Desktop APUs ===
==== Raven Ridge (2018) ====
Common features of Zen based Raven Ridge desktop APUs:

- Socket: AM4.
- All the CPUs support DDR4-2666 (DDR4-2933 Ryzen) in dual-channel mode.
- L1 cache: 96 KB (32 KB data + 64 KB instruction) per core.
- L2 cache: 512 KB per core.
- All the CPUs support 16 PCIe 3.0 lanes.
- Includes integrated GCN 5th generation GPU.
- Fabrication process: GlobalFoundries 14LP.

Model	CPU				GPU				TDP	Release date	Release price
Model	Cores (threads)	Clock rate (GHz)		L3 cache (total)	Model	Config (Note: Unified shaders : Texture mapping units : Render output units and Compute units (CU))	Clock (MHz)	Processing power (GFLOPS) (Note: Single-precision performance is calculated from the base (or boost) core clock speed based on a FMA operation.)	TDP	Release date	Release price
Model	Cores (threads)	Base	Boost	L3 cache (total)	Model	Config	Clock (MHz)	Processing power (GFLOPS)	TDP	Release date	Release price
Athlon 200GE	2 (4)	3.2	—N/a	4 MB	Vega 3	192:12:4; 3 CU	1000	384	35 W	Sep 6, 2018	US $55
Athlon Pro 200GE	2 (4)	3.2	—N/a	4 MB	Vega 3	192:12:4; 3 CU	1000	384	35 W	Sep 6, 2018	OEM
Athlon 220GE	2 (4)	3.4	—N/a	4 MB	Vega 3	192:12:4; 3 CU	1000	384	35 W	Dec 21, 2018	US $65
Athlon 240GE	2 (4)	3.5	—N/a	4 MB	Vega 3	192:12:4; 3 CU	1000	384	35 W	Dec 21, 2018	US $75
Athlon 300GE	2 (4)	3.4	—N/a	4 MB	Vega 3	192:12:4; 3 CU	1100	424.4	35 W	Jul 7, 2019	OEM
Athlon Pro 300GE	2 (4)	3.4	—N/a	4 MB	Vega 3	192:12:4; 3 CU	1100	424.4	35 W	Sep 30, 2019	OEM
Athlon 320GE	2 (4)	3.5	—N/a	4 MB	Vega 3	192:12:4; 3 CU	1100	424.4	35 W	Jul 7, 2019	OEM
Athlon 3000G	2 (4)	3.5	—N/a	4 MB	Vega 3	192:12:4; 3 CU	1100	424.4	35 W	Nov 19, 2019	US $49
Athlon Silver 3050GE	2 (4)	3.4	—N/a	4 MB	Vega 3	192:12:4; 3 CU	1100	424.4	35 W	Jul 21, 2020	OEM
Ryzen 3 Pro 2100GE	2 (4)	3.2	—N/a	4 MB	Vega 3	192:12:4; 3 CU	1000	384	35 W	2019	OEM
Ryzen 3 2200GE	4 (4)	3.2	3.6	4 MB	Vega 8	512:32:16; 8 CU	1100	1126	35 W	Apr 19, 2018	OEM
Ryzen 3 Pro 2200GE	4 (4)	3.2	3.6	4 MB	Vega 8	512:32:16; 8 CU	1100	1126	35 W	May 10, 2018	OEM
Ryzen 3 2200G	4 (4)	3.5	3.7	4 MB	Vega 8	512:32:16; 8 CU	1100	1126	65 W	Feb 12, 2018	US $99
Ryzen 3 Pro 2200G	4 (4)	3.5	3.7	4 MB	Vega 8	512:32:16; 8 CU	1100	1126	65 W	May 10, 2018	OEM
Ryzen 5 2400GE	4 (8)	3.2	3.8	4 MB	RX Vega 11	704:44:16; 11 CU	1250	1760	35 W	Apr 19, 2018	OEM
Ryzen 5 Pro 2400GE	4 (8)	3.2	3.8	4 MB	Vega 11	704:44:16; 11 CU	1250	1760	35 W	May 10, 2018	OEM
Ryzen 5 2400G	4 (8)	3.6	3.9	4 MB	RX Vega 11	704:44:16; 11 CU	1250	1760	65 W	Feb 12, 2018	US $169
Ryzen 5 Pro 2400G	4 (8)	3.6	3.9	4 MB	Vega 11	704:44:16; 11 CU	1250	1760	65 W	May 10, 2018	OEM

==== Picasso (2019) ====
Common features of Zen+ based desktop APUs:

- Socket: AM4.
- All the CPUs support DDR4-2933 in dual-channel mode, while Athlon Pro 300GE and Athlon Silver Pro 3125GE support only DDR4-2666.
- L1 cache: 96 KB (32 KB data + 64 KB instruction) per core.
- L2 cache: 512 KB per core.
- All the CPUs support 16 PCIe 3.0 lanes.
- Includes integrated GCN 5th generation GPU.
- Fabrication process: GlobalFoundries 12LP.

Model	CPU				GPU				TDP	Release date	Release price
Model	Cores (threads)	Clock rate (GHz)		L3 cache (total)	Model (Note: Starting with 2020 releases, AMD stopped referring to integrated graphics as "Vega", therefore all Vega based iGPUs are branded as AMD Radeon Graphics (instead Radeon Vega 3 or Radeon Vega 10).)	Config (Note: Unified shaders : Texture mapping units : Render output units and Compute units (CU))	Clock (MHz)	Processing power (GFLOPS) (Note: Single-precision performance is calculated from the base (or boost) core clock speed based on a FMA operation.)	TDP	Release date	Release price
Model	Cores (threads)	Base	Boost	L3 cache (total)	Model	Config	Clock (MHz)	Processing power (GFLOPS)	TDP	Release date	Release price
Athlon Pro 300GE	2 (4)	3.4	—N/a	4 MB	Vega 3	192:12:4; 3 CU	1100	424.4	35 W	Sep 30, 2019	OEM
Athlon Silver Pro 3125GE	2 (4)	3.4	—N/a	4 MB	Radeon; Graphics	192:12:4; 3 CU	1100	424.4	35 W	Jul 21, 2020	OEM
Athlon Gold 3150GE	4 (4)	3.3	3.8	4 MB	Radeon; Graphics	192:12:4; 3 CU	1100	424.4	35 W	Jul 21, 2020	OEM
Athlon Gold Pro 3150GE	4 (4)	3.3	3.8	4 MB	Radeon; Graphics	192:12:4; 3 CU	1100	424.4	35 W	Jul 21, 2020	OEM
Athlon Gold 3150G	4 (4)	3.5	3.9	4 MB	Radeon; Graphics	192:12:4; 3 CU	1100	424.4	65 W	Jul 21, 2020	OEM
Athlon Gold Pro 3150G	4 (4)	3.5	3.9	4 MB	Radeon; Graphics	192:12:4; 3 CU	1100	424.4	65 W	Jul 21, 2020	OEM
Ryzen 3 3200GE	4 (4)	3.3	3.8	4 MB	Vega 8	512:32:16; 8 CU	1200	1228.8	35 W	Jul 7, 2019	OEM
Ryzen 3 Pro 3200GE	4 (4)	3.3	3.8	4 MB	Vega 8	512:32:16; 8 CU	1200	1228.8	35 W	Sep 30, 2019	OEM
Ryzen 3 3200G	4 (4)	3.6	4.0	4 MB	Vega 8	512:32:16; 8 CU	1250	1280	65 W	Jul 7, 2019	US $99
Ryzen 3 Pro 3200G	4 (4)	3.6	4.0	4 MB	Vega 8	512:32:16; 8 CU	1250	1280	65 W	Sep 30, 2019	OEM
Ryzen 5 Pro 3350GE	4 (4)	3.3	3.9	4 MB	Radeon; Graphics	640:40:16; 10 CU	1200	1536	35 W	Jul 21, 2020	OEM
Ryzen 5 Pro 3350G	4 (8)	3.6	4.0	4 MB	Radeon; Graphics	640:40:16; 10 CU	1300	1830.4	65 W	Jul 21, 2020	OEM
Ryzen 5 3400GE	4 (8)	3.3	4.0	4 MB	Vega 11	704:44:16; 11 CU	1300	1830.4	35 W	Jul 7, 2019	OEM
Ryzen 5 Pro 3400GE	4 (8)	3.3	4.0	4 MB	Vega 11	704:44:16; 11 CU	1300	1830.4	35 W	Sep 30, 2019	OEM
Ryzen 5 3400G	4 (8)	3.7	4.2	4 MB	RX Vega 11	704:44:16; 11 CU	1400	1971.2	65 W	Jul 7, 2019	US $149
Ryzen 5 Pro 3400G	4 (8)	3.7	4.2	4 MB	Vega 11	704:44:16; 11 CU	1400	1971.2	65 W	Sep 30, 2019	OEM

==== Renoir (2020) ====
Common features of Ryzen 4000 desktop APUs:

- Socket: AM4.
- All the CPUs support DDR4-3200 in dual-channel mode.
- L1 cache: 64 KB (32 KB data + 32 KB instruction) per core.
- L2 cache: 512 KB per core.
- All the CPUs support 24 PCIe 3.0 lanes. 4 of the lanes are reserved as link to the chipset.
- Includes integrated GCN 5th generation GPU.
- Fabrication process: TSMC 7FF.

Branding and model		CPU					GPU				TDP	Release date	Release price
Branding and model		Cores (threads)	Clock rate (GHz)		L3 cache (total)	Core Config (Note: Core complexes (CCXs) × cores per CCX)	Model	Clock (GHz)	Config (Note: Unified shaders : Texture mapping units : Render output units and Compute units (CU))	Processing power (Note: Single-precision performance is calculated from the base (or boost) core clock speed based on a FMA operation.) (GFLOPS)	TDP	Release date	Release price
Branding and model		Cores (threads)	Base	Boost	L3 cache (total)	Core Config	Model	Clock (GHz)	Config	Processing power (GFLOPS)	TDP	Release date	Release price
Ryzen 7	4700G (Note: Model also available as PRO version as 4350GE, 4350G, 4650GE, 4650G, 4750GE, 4750G, released on July 21, 2020 for OEM only. Refresh models 4355GE, 4355G, 4655GE, 4655G released November 11, 2022.)	8 (16)	3.6	4.4	8 MB	2 × 4	Radeon; Graphics (Note: All of the iGPUs are branded as AMD Radeon Graphics.)	2.1	512:32:16; 8 CU	2150.4	65 W	Jul 21, 2020	OEM
Ryzen 7	4700GE	8 (16)	3.1	4.3	8 MB	2 × 4	Radeon; Graphics	2.0	512:32:16; 8 CU	2048	35 W	Jul 21, 2020	OEM
Ryzen 5	4600G	6 (12)	3.7	4.2	8 MB	2 × 3	Radeon; Graphics	1.9	448:28:14; 7 CU	1702.4	65 W	Jul 21, 2020 (OEM); Apr 4, 2022 (retail)	US $154
Ryzen 5	4600GE	6 (12)	3.3	4.2	8 MB	2 × 3	Radeon; Graphics	1.9	448:28:14; 7 CU	1702.4	35 W	Jul 21, 2020	OEM
Ryzen 3	4300G	4 (8)	3.8	4.0	4 MB	1 × 4	Radeon; Graphics	1.7	384:24:12; 6 CU	1305.6	65 W	Jul 21, 2020	OEM
Ryzen 3	4300GE	4 (8)	3.5	4.0	4 MB	1 × 4	Radeon; Graphics	1.7	384:24:12; 6 CU	1305.6	35 W	Jul 21, 2020	OEM

==== Cezanne (2021) ====
Common features of Ryzen 5000 desktop APUs:

- Socket: AM4.
- All the CPUs support DDR4-3200 in dual-channel mode.
- L1 cache: 64 KB (32 KB data + 32 KB instruction) per core.
- L2 cache: 512 KB per core.
- All the CPUs support 24 PCIe 3.0 lanes. 4 of the lanes are reserved as link to the chipset.
- Includes integrated GCN 5th generation GPU.
- Fabrication process: TSMC 7FF.

Branding and model		CPU					GPU (Note: All of the iGPUs are branded as AMD Radeon Graphics.)			Thermal solution	TDP	Release date	MSRP
Branding and model		Cores (threads)	Clock rate (GHz)		L3 cache (total)	Core config (Note: Core Complexes (CCX) × cores per CCX)	Clock (MHz)	Config (Note: Unified shaders : texture mapping units : render output units and compute units (CU))	Processing power (Note: Single precision performance is calculated from the base (or boost) core clock speed based on a FMA operation.) (GFLOPS)	Thermal solution	TDP	Release date	MSRP
Branding and model		Cores (threads)	Base	Boost	L3 cache (total)	Core config	Clock (MHz)	Config	Processing power (GFLOPS)	Thermal solution	TDP	Release date	MSRP
Ryzen 7	5705G	8 (16)	3.8	4.6	16 MB	1 × 8	2000	512:32:8; 8 CU	2048	—N/a	65 W		
Ryzen 7	5700G (Note: Model also available as PRO version as 5350GE, 5350G, 5650GE, 5650G, 5750GE, 5750G, released June 1, 2021. Refresh models 5355GE, 5355G, 5655GE, 5655G, 5755GE, 5755G released September 5, 2024.)	8 (16)	3.8	4.6	16 MB	1 × 8	2000	512:32:8; 8 CU	2048	Wraith Stealth	65 W	Apr 13, 2021 (OEM), Aug 5, 2021 (retail)	US $359
Ryzen 7	5705GE	8 (16)	3.2	4.6	16 MB	1 × 8	2000	512:32:8; 8 CU	2048	—N/a	35 W		
Ryzen 7	5700GE	8 (16)	3.2	4.6	16 MB	1 × 8	2000	512:32:8; 8 CU	2048	Wraith Stealth	35 W	Apr 13, 2021	OEM
Ryzen 5	5600GT	6 (12)	3.6	4.6	16 MB	1 × 6	1900	448:28:8; 7 CU	1702.4	Wraith Stealth	65 W	Jan 31, 2024	US $140
Ryzen 5	5605G	6 (12)	3.9	4.4	16 MB	1 × 6	1900	448:28:8; 7 CU	1702.4	—N/a	65 W		
Ryzen 5	5600G	6 (12)	3.9	4.4	16 MB	1 × 6	1900	448:28:8; 7 CU	1702.4	Wraith Stealth	65 W	Apr 13, 2021 (OEM), Aug 5, 2021 (retail)	US $259
Ryzen 5	5605GE	6 (12)	3.4	4.4	16 MB	1 × 6	1900	448:28:8; 7 CU	1702.4	—N/a	35 W		
Ryzen 5	5600GE	6 (12)	3.4	4.4	16 MB	1 × 6	1900	448:28:8; 7 CU	1702.4	Wraith Stealth	35 W	Apr 13, 2021	OEM
Ryzen 5	5500GT	6 (12)	3.6	4.4	16 MB	1 × 6	1900	448:28:8; 7 CU	1702.4	Wraith Stealth	65 W	Jan 08, 2024	US $125
Ryzen 3	5305G	4 (8)	4.0	4.2	8 MB	1 × 4	1700	384:24:8; 6 CU	1305.6	—N/a	65 W		
Ryzen 3	5300G	4 (8)	4.0	4.2	8 MB	1 × 4	1700	384:24:8; 6 CU	1305.6	OEM	65 W	Apr 13, 2021	OEM
Ryzen 3	5305GE	4 (8)	3.6	4.2	8 MB	1 × 4	1700	384:24:8; 6 CU	1305.6	—N/a	35 W		
Ryzen 3	5300GE	4 (8)	3.6	4.2	8 MB	1 × 4	1700	384:24:8; 6 CU	1305.6	OEM	35 W	Apr 13, 2021	OEM

=== Mobile APUs ===
==== Raven Ridge (2017) ====
Model	Release date	Fab	CPU						GPU				Socket	PCIe lanes	Memory support	TDP
Model	Release date	Fab	Cores (threads)	Clock rate (GHz)		Cache			Model	Config (Note: Unified shaders : Texture mapping units : Render output units and Compute units (CU))	Clock (MHz)	Processing power (GFLOPS) (Note: Single precision performance is calculated from the base (or boost) core clock speed based on a FMA operation.)	Socket	PCIe lanes	Memory support	TDP
Model	Release date	Fab	Cores (threads)	Base	Boost	L1	L2	L3	Model	Config	Clock (MHz)	Processing power (GFLOPS)	Socket	PCIe lanes	Memory support	TDP
Athlon Pro 200U	2019	GloFo; 14LP	2 (4)	2.3	3.2	64 KB inst. 32 KB data per core	512 KB per core	4 MB	Radeon Vega 3	192:12:4; 3 CU	1000	384	FP5	12 (8+4)	DDR4-2400 dual-channel	12–25 W
Athlon 300U	Jan 6, 2019	GloFo; 14LP	2 (4)	2.4	3.3	64 KB inst. 32 KB data per core	512 KB per core	4 MB	Radeon Vega 3	192:12:4; 3 CU	1000	384	FP5	12 (8+4)	DDR4-2400 dual-channel	12–25 W
Ryzen 3 2200U	Jan 8, 2018	GloFo; 14LP	2 (4)	2.5	3.4	64 KB inst. 32 KB data per core	512 KB per core	4 MB	Radeon Vega 3	192:12:4; 3 CU	1100	422.4	FP5	12 (8+4)	DDR4-2400 dual-channel	12–25 W
Ryzen 3 3200U	Jan 6, 2019	GloFo; 14LP	2 (4)	2.6	3.5	64 KB inst. 32 KB data per core	512 KB per core	4 MB	Radeon Vega 3	192:12:4; 3 CU	1200	460.8	FP5	12 (8+4)	DDR4-2400 dual-channel	12–25 W
Ryzen 3 2300U	Jan 8, 2018	GloFo; 14LP	4 (4)	2.0	3.4	64 KB inst. 32 KB data per core	512 KB per core	4 MB	Radeon Vega 6	384:24:8; 6 CU	1100	844.8	FP5	12 (8+4)	DDR4-2400 dual-channel	12–25 W
Ryzen 3 Pro 2300U	May 15, 2018	GloFo; 14LP	4 (4)	2.0	3.4	64 KB inst. 32 KB data per core	512 KB per core	4 MB	Radeon Vega 6	384:24:8; 6 CU	1100	844.8	FP5	12 (8+4)	DDR4-2400 dual-channel	12–25 W
Ryzen 5 2500U	Oct 26, 2017	GloFo; 14LP	4 (8)	2.0	3.6	64 KB inst. 32 KB data per core	512 KB per core	4 MB	Radeon Vega 8	512:32:16; 8 CU	1100	1126.4	FP5	12 (8+4)	DDR4-2400 dual-channel	12–25 W
Ryzen 5 Pro 2500U	May 15, 2018	GloFo; 14LP	4 (8)	2.0	3.6	64 KB inst. 32 KB data per core	512 KB per core	4 MB	Radeon Vega 8	512:32:16; 8 CU	1100	1126.4	FP5	12 (8+4)	DDR4-2400 dual-channel	12–25 W
Ryzen 5 2600H	Sep 10, 2018	GloFo; 14LP	4 (8)	3.2	3.6	64 KB inst. 32 KB data per core	512 KB per core	4 MB	Radeon Vega 8	512:32:16; 8 CU	1100	1126.4	FP5	12 (8+4)	DDR4-3200 dual-channel	35–54 W
Ryzen 7 2700U	Oct 26, 2017	GloFo; 14LP	4 (8)	2.2	3.8	64 KB inst. 32 KB data per core	512 KB per core	4 MB	Radeon RX Vega 10	640:40:16; 10 CU	1300	1664	FP5	12 (8+4)	DDR4-2400 dual-channel	12–25 W
Ryzen 7 Pro 2700U	May 15, 2018	GloFo; 14LP	4 (8)	2.2	3.8	64 KB inst. 32 KB data per core	512 KB per core	4 MB	Radeon Vega 10	640:40:16; 10 CU	1300	1664	FP5	12 (8+4)	DDR4-2400 dual-channel	12–25 W
Ryzen 7 2800H	Sep 10, 2018	GloFo; 14LP	4 (8)	3.3	3.8	64 KB inst. 32 KB data per core	512 KB per core	4 MB	Radeon RX Vega 11	704:44:16; 11 CU	1300	1830.4	FP5	12 (8+4)	DDR4-3200 dual-channel	35–54 W

==== Picasso (2019) ====
Common features of Ryzen 3000 notebook APUs:

- Socket: FP5.
- All the CPUs support DDR4-2400 in dual-channel mode.
- L1 cache: 96 KB (32 KB data + 64 KB instruction) per core.
- L2 cache: 512 KB per core.
- All the CPUs support 16 PCIe 3.0 lanes.
- Includes integrated GCN 5th generation GPU.
- Fabrication process: GlobalFoundries 12LP (14LP+).

Branding and Model		CPU					GPU				TDP	Release date
Branding and Model		Cores (threads)	Clock rate (GHz)		L3 cache (total)	Core config (Note: Core Complexes (CCX) × cores per CCX)	Model	Clock (GHz)	Config (Note: Unified Shaders : Texture Mapping Units : Render Output Units and Compute Units (CU))	Processing power (GFLOPS) (Note: Single precision performance is calculated from the base (or boost) core clock speed based on a FMA operation.)	TDP	Release date
Branding and Model		Cores (threads)	Base	Boost	L3 cache (total)	Core config	Model	Clock (GHz)	Config	Processing power (GFLOPS)	TDP	Release date
Ryzen 7	3780U	4 (8)	2.3	4.0	4 MB	1 × 4	RX Vega 11	1.4	704:44:16; 11 CU	1971.2	15 W	Oct 2019
Ryzen 7	3750H	4 (8)	2.3	4.0	4 MB	1 × 4	RX Vega 10	1.4	640:40:16; 10 CU	1792.0	35 W	Jan 6, 2019
Ryzen 7	3700C	4 (8)	2.3	4.0	4 MB	1 × 4	RX Vega 10	1.4	640:40:16; 10 CU	1792.0	15 W	Sep 22, 2020
Ryzen 7	3700U (Note: Model also available as PRO version, released April 8, 2019.)	4 (8)	2.3	4.0	4 MB	1 × 4	RX Vega 10	1.4	640:40:16; 10 CU	1792.0	15 W	Jan 6, 2019
Ryzen 5	3580U	4 (8)	2.1	3.7	4 MB	1 × 4	Vega 9	1.3	576:36:16; 9 CU	1497.6	15 W	Oct 2019
Ryzen 5	3550H	4 (8)	2.1	3.7	4 MB	1 × 4	Vega 8	1.2	512:32:8; 8 CU	1228.8	35 W	Jan 6, 2019
Ryzen 5	3500C	4 (8)	2.1	3.7	4 MB	1 × 4	Vega 8	1.2	512:32:8; 8 CU	1228.8	15 W	Sep 22, 2020
Ryzen 5	3500U	4 (8)	2.1	3.7	4 MB	1 × 4	Vega 8	1.2	512:32:8; 8 CU	1228.8	15 W	Jan 6, 2019
Ryzen 5	3450U	4 (8)	2.1	3.5	4 MB	1 × 4	Vega 8	1.2	512:32:8; 8 CU	1228.8	15 W	Jun 2020
Ryzen 3	3350U	4 (4)	2.1	3.5	4 MB	1 × 4	Vega 6	1.2	384:24:8; 6 CU	921.6	15 W	Jan 6, 2019
Ryzen 3	3300U	4 (4)	2.1	3.5	4 MB	1 × 4	Vega 6	1.2	384:24:8; 6 CU	921.6	15 W	Jan 6, 2019

==== Dalí (2020) ====
Model	Release date	Fab	CPU						GPU				Socket	PCIe lanes	Memory support	TDP	Part number
Model	Release date	Fab	Cores (threads)	Clock rate (GHz)		Cache			Model	Config (Note: Unified shaders : Texture mapping units : Render output units and Compute units (CU))	Clock (GHz)	Processing power (GFLOPS) (Note: Single precision performance is calculated from the base (or boost) core clock speed based on a FMA operation.)	Socket	PCIe lanes	Memory support	TDP	Part number
Model	Release date	Fab	Cores (threads)	Base	Boost	L1	L2	L3	Model	Config	Clock (GHz)	Processing power (GFLOPS)	Socket	PCIe lanes	Memory support	TDP	Part number
AMD 3020e	Jan 6, 2020	14 nm	2 (2)	1.2	2.6	64 KB inst. 32 KB data per core	512 KB per core	4 MB	Radeon; Graphics (Vega)	192:12:4; 3 CU	1.0	384	FP5	12 (8+4)	DDR4-2400 dual-channel	6 W	YM3020C7T2OFG
Athlon PRO 3045B	Q1 2021	14 nm	2 (2)	2.3	3.2	64 KB inst. 32 KB data per core	512 KB per core	4 MB	Radeon; Graphics (Vega)	128:8:4; 2 CU	1.1	281.6	FP5	12 (8+4)	DDR4-2400 dual-channel	15 W	YM3045C4T2OFG
Athlon Silver 3050U	Jan 6, 2020	14 nm	2 (2)	2.3	3.2	64 KB inst. 32 KB data per core	512 KB per core	4 MB	Radeon; Graphics (Vega)	128:8:4; 2 CU	1.1	281.6	FP5	12 (8+4)	DDR4-2400 dual-channel	15 W	YM3050C4T2OFG
Athlon Silver 3050C	Sep 22, 2020	14 nm	2 (2)	2.3	3.2	64 KB inst. 32 KB data per core	512 KB per core	4 MB	Radeon; Graphics (Vega)	128:8:4; 2 CU	1.1	281.6	FP5	12 (8+4)	DDR4-2400 dual-channel	15 W	YM305CC4T2OFG
Athlon Silver 3050e	Jan 6, 2020	14 nm	2 (4)	1.4	2.8	64 KB inst. 32 KB data per core	512 KB per core	4 MB	Radeon; Graphics (Vega)	192:12:4; 3 CU	1.0	384	FP5	12 (8+4)	DDR4-2400 dual-channel	6 W	YM3050C7T2OFG
Athlon PRO 3145B	Q1 2021	14 nm	2 (4)	2.4	3.3	64 KB inst. 32 KB data per core	512 KB per core	4 MB	Radeon; Graphics (Vega)	192:12:4; 3 CU	1.0	384	FP5	12 (8+4)	DDR4-2400 dual-channel	15 W	YM3145C4T2OFG
Athlon Gold 3150U	Jan 6, 2020	14 nm	2 (4)	2.4	3.3	64 KB inst. 32 KB data per core	512 KB per core	4 MB	Radeon; Graphics (Vega)	192:12:4; 3 CU	1.0	384	FP5	12 (8+4)	DDR4-2400 dual-channel	15 W	YM3150C4T2OFG
Athlon Gold 3150C	Sep 22, 2020	14 nm	2 (4)	2.4	3.3	64 KB inst. 32 KB data per core	512 KB per core	4 MB	Radeon; Graphics (Vega)	192:12:4; 3 CU	1.0	384	FP5	12 (8+4)	DDR4-2400 dual-channel	15 W	YM315CC4T2OFG
Ryzen 3 3250U	Jan 6, 2020	14 nm	2 (4)	2.6	3.5	64 KB inst. 32 KB data per core	512 KB per core	4 MB	Radeon; Graphics (Vega)	192:12:4; 3 CU	1.2	460.8	FP5	12 (8+4)	DDR4-2400 dual-channel	15 W	YM3250C4T2OFG
Ryzen 3 3250C	Sep 22, 2020	14 nm	2 (4)	2.6	3.5	64 KB inst. 32 KB data per core	512 KB per core	4 MB	Radeon; Graphics (Vega)	192:12:4; 3 CU	1.2	460.8	FP5	12 (8+4)	DDR4-2400 dual-channel	15 W	YM325CC4T2OFG

==== Renoir (2020) ====
Common features of Ryzen 4000 notebook APUs:

- Socket: FP6.
- All the CPUs support DDR4-3200 or LPDDR4-4266 in dual-channel mode.
- L1 cache: 64 KB (32 KB data + 32 KB instruction) per core.
- L2 cache: 512 KB per core.
- All the CPUs support 16 PCIe 3.0 lanes.
- Includes integrated GCN 5th generation GPU.
- Fabrication process: TSMC 7FF.

Branding and Model		CPU					GPU				TDP	Release date
Branding and Model		Cores (threads)	Clock rate (GHz)		L3 cache (total)	Core config (Note: Core Complexes (CCX) × cores per CCX)	Model	Clock (GHz)	Config (Note: Unified shaders : texture mapping units : render output units and compute units (CU))	Processing power (GFLOPS) (Note: Single precision performance is calculated from the base (or boost) core clock speed based on a FMA operation.)	TDP	Release date
Branding and Model		Cores (threads)	Base	Boost	L3 cache (total)	Core config	Model	Clock (GHz)	Config	Processing power (GFLOPS)	TDP	Release date
Ryzen 9	4900H	8 (16)	3.3	4.4	8 MB	2 × 4	Radeon; Graphics (Note: All of the iGPUs are branded as AMD Radeon Graphics.)	1.75	512:32:8; 8 CU	1792	35–54 W	Mar 16, 2020
Ryzen 9	4900HS	8 (16)	3.0	4.3	8 MB	2 × 4	Radeon; Graphics	1.75	512:32:8; 8 CU	1792	35 W	Mar 16, 2020
Ryzen 7	4800H	8 (16)	2.9	4.2	8 MB	2 × 4	Radeon; Graphics	1.6	448:28:8; 7 CU	1433.6	35–54 W	Mar 16, 2020
Ryzen 7	4800HS	8 (16)	2.9	4.2	8 MB	2 × 4	Radeon; Graphics	1.6	448:28:8; 7 CU	1433.6	35 W	Mar 16, 2020
Ryzen 7	4980U (Note: Only found on the Microsoft Surface Laptop 4.)	8 (16)	2.0	4.4	8 MB	2 × 4	Radeon; Graphics	1.95	512:32:8; 8 CU	1996.8	10–25 W	Apr 13, 2021
Ryzen 7	4800U	8 (16)	1.8	4.2	8 MB	2 × 4	Radeon; Graphics	1.75	512:32:8; 8 CU	1792	10–25 W	Mar 16, 2020
Ryzen 7	4700U (Note: Model also available as PRO version as 4450U, 4650U, 4750U, released May 7, 2020.)	8 (8)	2.0	4.1	8 MB	2 × 4	Radeon; Graphics	1.6	448:28:8; 7 CU	1433.6	10–25 W	Mar 16, 2020
Ryzen 5	4600H	6 (12)	3.0	4.0	8 MB	2 × 3	Radeon; Graphics	1.5	384:24:8; 6 CU	1152	35–54 W	Mar 16, 2020
Ryzen 5	4600HS	6 (12)	3.0	4.0	8 MB	2 × 3	Radeon; Graphics	1.5	384:24:8; 6 CU	1152	35 W	Mar 16, 2020
Ryzen 5	4680U	6 (12)	2.1	4.0	8 MB	2 × 3	Radeon; Graphics	1.5	448:28:8; 7 CU	1344	10–25 W	Apr 13, 2021
Ryzen 5	4600U	6 (12)	2.1	4.0	8 MB	2 × 3	Radeon; Graphics	1.5	384:24:8; 6 CU	1152	10–25 W	Mar 16, 2020
Ryzen 5	4500U	6 (6)	2.3	4.0	8 MB	2 × 3	Radeon; Graphics	1.5	384:24:8; 6 CU	1152	10–25 W	Mar 16, 2020
Ryzen 3	4300U	4 (4)	2.7	3.7	4 MB	1 × 4	Radeon; Graphics	1.4	320:20:8; 5 CU	896	10–25 W	Mar 16, 2020

==== Lucienne (2021) ====
Common features of Ryzen 5000 notebook APUs:

- Socket: FP6.
- All the CPUs support DDR4-3200 or LPDDR4-4266 in dual-channel mode.
- L1 cache: 64 KB (32 KB data + 32 KB instruction) per core.
- L2 cache: 512 KB per core.
- All the CPUs support 16 PCIe 3.0 lanes.
- Includes integrated GCN 5th generation GPU.
- Fabrication process: TSMC 7FF.

Branding and Model		CPU					GPU				TDP	Release date
Branding and Model		Cores (threads)	Clock rate (GHz)		L3 cache (total)	Core config (Note: Core Complexes (CCX) × cores per CCX)	Model	Clock (GHz)	Config (Note: Unified shaders : texture mapping units : render output units and compute units (CU))	Processing power (GFLOPS) (Note: Single precision performance is calculated from the base (or boost) core clock speed based on a FMA operation.)	TDP	Release date
Branding and Model		Cores (threads)	Base	Boost	L3 cache (total)	Core config	Model	Clock (GHz)	Config	Processing power (GFLOPS)	TDP	Release date
Ryzen 7	5700U	8 (16)	1.8	4.3	8 MB	2 × 4	Radeon; Graphics (Note: All of the iGPUs are branded as AMD Radeon Graphics.)	1.9	512:32:8; 8 CU	1945.6	10–25 W	Jan 12, 2021
Ryzen 5	5500U	6 (12)	2.1	4.0	8 MB	2 × 3	Radeon; Graphics	1.8	448:28:8; 7 CU	1612.8	10–25 W	Jan 12, 2021
Ryzen 3	5300U	4 (8)	2.6	3.8	4 MB	1 × 4	Radeon; Graphics	1.5	384:24:8; 6 CU	1152	10–25 W	Jan 12, 2021

==== Cezanne (2021) ====
Common features of Ryzen 5000 notebook APUs:

- Socket: FP6.
- All the CPUs support DDR4-3200 or LPDDR4-4266 in dual-channel mode.
- L1 cache: 64 KB (32 KB data + 32 KB instruction) per core.
- L2 cache: 512 KB per core.
- All the CPUs support 16 PCIe 3.0 lanes.
- Includes integrated GCN 5th generation GPU.
- Fabrication process: TSMC 7FF.

Branding and model		CPU						GPU				TDP	Release date
Branding and model		Cores (threads)	Clock rate (GHz)			L3 cache (total)	Core config (Note: Core Complexes (CCX) × cores per CCX)	Model	Clock (GHz)	Config (Note: Unified shaders : texture mapping units : render output units and compute units (CU))	Processing power (GFLOPS) (Note: Single precision performance is calculated from the base (or boost) core clock speed based on a FMA operation.)	TDP	Release date
Branding and model		Cores (threads)	Base	Boost (Single Core)	Boost (All Core)	L3 cache (total)	Core config	Model	Clock (GHz)	Config	Processing power (GFLOPS)	TDP	Release date
Ryzen 9	5980HX	8 (16)	3.3	4.8	4.4	16 MB	1 × 8	Radeon; Graphics (Note: All of the iGPUs are branded as AMD Radeon Graphics.)	2.1	512:32:8; 8 CUs	2150.4	35–54 W	Jan 12, 2021
Ryzen 9	5980HS	8 (16)	3.0	4.8	4.0	16 MB	1 × 8	Radeon; Graphics	2.1	512:32:8; 8 CUs	2150.4	35 W	Jan 12, 2021
Ryzen 9	5900HX	8 (16)	3.3	4.6	4.2	16 MB	1 × 8	Radeon; Graphics	2.1	512:32:8; 8 CUs	2150.4	35–54 W	Jan 12, 2021
Ryzen 9	5900HS	8 (16)	3.0	4.6	4.0	16 MB	1 × 8	Radeon; Graphics	2.1	512:32:8; 8 CUs	2150.4	35 W	Jan 12, 2021
Ryzen 7	5800H	8 (16)	3.2	4.4		16 MB	1 × 8	Radeon; Graphics	2.0	512:32:8; 8 CUs	2048	35–54 W	Jan 12, 2021
Ryzen 7	5800HS	8 (16)	2.8	4.4		16 MB	1 × 8	Radeon; Graphics	2.0	512:32:8; 8 CUs	2048	35 W	Jan 12, 2021
Ryzen 7	5825U (Note: Model also available as PRO version as 5450U, 5650U, 5850U, released on March 16, 2021 and as 5475U, 5675U, 5875U, released on April 19, 2022.) (Note: Model also available as Chromebook optimized version as 5425C, 5625C, 5825C, released on May 5, 2022.)	8 (16)	2.0	4.5		16 MB	1 × 8	Radeon; Graphics	2.0	512:32:8; 8 CUs	2048	15 W	Jan 4, 2022
Ryzen 7	5800U	8 (16)	1.9	4.4	3.4	16 MB	1 × 8	Radeon; Graphics	2.0	512:32:8; 8 CUs	2048	10–25 W	Jan 12, 2021
Ryzen 5	5600H	6 (12)	3.3	4.2		16 MB	1 × 6	Radeon; Graphics	1.8	448:28:8; 7 CUs	1612.8	35–54 W	Jan 12, 2021
Ryzen 5	5600HS	6 (12)	3.0	4.2		16 MB	1 × 6	Radeon; Graphics	1.8	448:28:8; 7 CUs	1612.8	35 W	Jan 12, 2021
Ryzen 5	5625U	6 (12)	2.3	4.3	3.6	16 MB	1 × 6	Radeon; Graphics	1.8	448:28:8; 7 CUs	1612.8	15 W	Jan 4, 2022
Ryzen 5	5600U	6 (12)	2.3	4.2	3.6	16 MB	1 × 6	Radeon; Graphics	1.8	448:28:8; 7 CUs	1612.8	10–25 W	Jan 12, 2021
Ryzen 5	5560U	6 (12)	2.3	4.0		8 MB	1 × 6	Radeon; Graphics	1.6	384:24:8; 6 CUs	1228.8	10–25 W	Jan 12, 2021
Ryzen 5	5500H	4 (8)	3.3	4.2		8 MB	1 × 4	Radeon; Graphics	1.8	384:24:8; 6 CUs	1382.4	35–54 W	Jun 23, 2023
Ryzen 3	5425U	4 (8)	2.7	4.1	3.8	8 MB	1 × 4	Radeon; Graphics	1.6	384:24:8; 6 CUs	1228.8	15 W	Jan 4, 2022
Ryzen 3	5400U	4 (8)	2.6	4.0	3.8	8 MB	1 × 4	Radeon; Graphics	1.6	384:24:8; 6 CUs	1228.8	10–25 W	Jan 12, 2021
Ryzen 3	5125C	2 (4)	3.0	—N/a	—N/a	8 MB	1 × 2	Radeon; Graphics	1.2	192:12:8; 3 CUs	460.8	15 W	May 5, 2022

=== Embedded APUs ===
Model	Release date	Fab	CPU						GPU				Memory support	TDP	Junction temp. range (°C)
Model	Release date	Fab	Cores (threads)	Clock rate (GHz)		Cache			Model	Config (Note: Unified Shaders : Texture Mapping Units : Render Output Units and Compute Units (CU))	Clock (GHz)	Processing power (GFLOPS) (Note: Single-precision performance is calculated from the base (or boost) core clock speed based on a FMA operation.)	Memory support	TDP	Junction temp. range (°C)
Model	Release date	Fab	Cores (threads)	Base	Boost	L1	L2	L3	Model	Config	Clock (GHz)	Processing power (GFLOPS)	Memory support	TDP	Junction temp. range (°C)
V1202B	February 2018	GloFo; 14LP	2 (4)	2.3	3.2	64 KB inst. 32 KB data per core	512 KB per core	4 MB	Vega 3	192:12:16; 3 CU	1.0	384	DDR4-2400 dual-channel	12–25 W	0–105
V1404I	December 2018	GloFo; 14LP	4 (8)	2.0	3.6	64 KB inst. 32 KB data per core	512 KB per core	4 MB	Vega 8	512:32:16; 8 CU	1.1	1126.4	DDR4-2400 dual-channel	12–25 W	-40–105
V1500B	December 2018	GloFo; 14LP	4 (8)	2.2	—N/a	64 KB inst. 32 KB data per core	512 KB per core	4 MB	—N/a				DDR4-2400 dual-channel	12–25 W	0–105
V1605B	February 2018	GloFo; 14LP	4 (8)	2.0	3.6	64 KB inst. 32 KB data per core	512 KB per core	4 MB	Vega 8	512:32:16; 8 CU	1.1	1126.4	DDR4-2400 dual-channel	12–25 W	0–105
V1756B	February 2018	GloFo; 14LP	4 (8)	3.25	3.6	64 KB inst. 32 KB data per core	512 KB per core	4 MB	Vega 8	512:32:16; 8 CU	1.1	1126.4	DDR4-3200 dual-channel	35–54 W	0–105
V1780B	December 2018	GloFo; 14LP	4 (8)	3.35	3.6	64 KB inst. 32 KB data per core	512 KB per core	4 MB	—N/a				DDR4-3200 dual-channel	35–54 W	0–105
V1807B	February 2018	GloFo; 14LP	4 (8)	3.35	3.8	64 KB inst. 32 KB data per core	512 KB per core	4 MB	Vega 11	704:44:16; 11 CU	1.3	1830.4	DDR4-3200 dual-channel	35–54 W	0–105

Model	Release date	Fab	CPU						GPU				Memory support	TDP
Model	Release date	Fab	Cores (threads)	Clock rate (GHz)		Cache			Model	Config (Note: Unified Shaders : Texture Mapping Units : Render Output Units and Compute Units (CU))	Clock (GHz)	Processing power (GFLOPS) (Note: Single-precision performance is calculated from the base (or boost) core clock speed based on a FMA operation.)	Memory support	TDP
Model	Release date	Fab	Cores (threads)	Base	Boost	L1	L2	L3	Model	Config	Clock (GHz)	Processing power (GFLOPS)	Memory support	TDP
R1102G	February 25, 2020	GloFo; 14LP	2 (2)	1.2	2.6	64 KB inst. 32 KB data per core	512 KB per core	4 MB	Vega 3	192:12:4; 3 CU	1.0	384	DDR4-2400 single-channel	6 W
R1305G	February 25, 2020	GloFo; 14LP	2 (4)	1.5	2.8	64 KB inst. 32 KB data per core	512 KB per core	4 MB	Vega 3	192:12:4; 3 CU	1.0	384	DDR4-2400 dual-channel	8-10 W
R1505G	April 16, 2019	GloFo; 14LP	2 (4)	2.4	3.3	64 KB inst. 32 KB data per core	512 KB per core	4 MB	Vega 3	192:12:4; 3 CU	1.0	384	DDR4-2400 dual-channel	12–25 W
R1606G	April 16, 2019	GloFo; 14LP	2 (4)	2.6	3.5	64 KB inst. 32 KB data per core	512 KB per core	4 MB	Vega 3	192:12:4; 3 CU	1.2	460.8	DDR4-2400 dual-channel	12–25 W

Model	Release date	Fab	CPU						GPU				Socket	PCIe support	Memory support	TDP
Model	Release date	Fab	Cores (threads)	Clock rate (GHz)		Cache			Archi- tecture	Config (Note: Unified Shaders : Texture Mapping Units : Render Output Units and Compute Units (CU))	Clock (GHz)	Processing power (Note: Single-precision performance is calculated from the base (or boost) core clock speed based on a FMA operation.) (GFLOPS)	Socket	PCIe support	Memory support	TDP
Model	Release date	Fab	Cores (threads)	Base	Boost	L1	L2	L3	Archi- tecture	Config	Clock (GHz)	Processing power (GFLOPS)	Socket	PCIe support	Memory support	TDP
V2516	Nov 10, 2020	TSMC; 7FF	6 (12)	2.1	3.95	32 KB inst. 32 KB data per core	512 KB per core	8 MB	GCN 5	384:24:8; 6 CU	1.5	1152	FP6	20 (8+4+4+4); PCIe 3.0	DDR4-3200 dual-channel LPDDR4X-4266 quad-channel	10–25 W
V2546	Nov 10, 2020	TSMC; 7FF	6 (12)	3.0	3.95	32 KB inst. 32 KB data per core	512 KB per core	8 MB	GCN 5	384:24:8; 6 CU	1.5	1152	FP6	20 (8+4+4+4); PCIe 3.0	DDR4-3200 dual-channel LPDDR4X-4266 quad-channel	35–54 W
V2A46	Jan 4, 2023	TSMC; 7FF	6 (12)	3.0	3.2	32 KB inst. 32 KB data per core	512 KB per core	8 MB	GCN 5	448:28:8; 7 CU	1.6	1433.6	FP6	20 (8+4+4+4); PCIe 3.0	DDR4-3200 dual-channel LPDDR4X-4266 quad-channel	35–54 W
V2718	Nov 10, 2020	TSMC; 7FF	8 (16)	1.7	4.15	32 KB inst. 32 KB data per core	512 KB per core	8 MB	GCN 5	448:28:8; 7 CU	1.6	1433.6	FP6	20 (8+4+4+4); PCIe 3.0	DDR4-3200 dual-channel LPDDR4X-4266 quad-channel	10–25 W
V2748	Nov 10, 2020	TSMC; 7FF	8 (16)	2.9	4.25	32 KB inst. 32 KB data per core	512 KB per core	8 MB	GCN 5	448:28:8; 7 CU	1.6	1433.6	FP6	20 (8+4+4+4); PCIe 3.0	DDR4-3200 dual-channel LPDDR4X-4266 quad-channel	35–54 W

== See also ==
- Kaby Lake G processors
- Radeon Vega Frontier Edition
- List of AMD graphics processing units
