= MX IGP =

MX IGP may refer to:

- GeForce2 MX IGP
- GeForce4 MX IGP
