= High-Definition Video Processor =

Nvidia product

Nvidia's High-Definition Digital Processing (HDVP) is an HDTV accelerator on the GeForce 2 GTS. It has a downscaler that supports 1080i and 720p to SDTV resolution. In combination with a tuner chip it creates an accelerated HDTV viewing system that supports time-shifted recording. The Geforce 2 GTS also includes second generation motion compensation, improved from the motion compensation on the GeForce 256. It does not seem to include IDCT acceleration. The HDVP also includes de-interlace acceleration including bob, weave, temporal filter, and advanced de-interlacing. Finally, HDVP supports subpicture compositing, and color enhancements including brightness, hue, contrast, and saturation. nVidia's HDVP would endure through the GeForce 4 series in the Geforce 4 Ti NV25.

== See also ==
- GeForce 256's Motion Compensation
- Video Processing Engine
- PureVideo
- DirectX Video Acceleration (DxVA) API for Microsoft Windows operating-system.
- VDPAU (Video Decode and Presentation API for Unix) from Nvidia
- X-Video Motion Compensation (XvMC) API for Linux/UNIX operating-system.
