= Codec acceleration =

Codec acceleration describes computer hardware that offloads the computationally intensive compression or decompression. This allows, for instance, a mobile phone to decode what would generally be a very difficult, and expensive video to decode it with no stuttering, and using less battery life than un-accelerated decoding would have taken. Similar acceleration is used on a broad variety of other appliances and computers for similar reasons. What could take a general purpose processor 100 Watts to decode on a general purpose processor, could take 10W on a graphics processing unit, and even less on a dedicated hardware codec.

== Video codec acceleration ==
Video codec acceleration is where video (usually including audio as well) encoding and decoding is accelerated in hardware. Various vendors have developed their own video codec acceleration framework.

Video codec acceleration frameworks
Framework	developed by
Nvidia NVDEC	Nvidia
Advanced Media Framework	AMD
Intel Quick Sync Video	Intel

== Audio codec acceleration ==
Audio codec acceleration is where audio encoding and decoding is accelerated in hardware.

== See also ==
- iDCT
- Motion compensation
- Discrete cosine transform (DCT)
- Quantization
- Variable-length code
- Information theory - Entropy
- DirectX Video Acceleration
- High-Definition Video Processor
- Intel Clear Video
- Intel Quick Sync Video
- Nvidia PureVideo
- Nvidia NVDEC
- Unified Video Decoder
- Video Immersion
- Video Processing Engine
