= Celsius (microarchitecture) =

GPU microarchitecture by Nvidia

Nvidia Celsius
- Release date: 1999-2005 1999
- Architecture: Celsius
- Fabrication process: 220 nm, 180nm, 150 nm

API support
- Direct3D: 7.0
- OpenGL: 1.2 (1.5)

History
- Predecessor: Fahrenheit
- Successor: Kelvin

Support status
- Unsupported

Celsius is the codename for a GPU microarchitecture developed by Nvidia, and released in 1999. It was named with reference to Anders Celsius and used with the GeForce 256 and GeForce 2 series.

== Naming convention ==
While Celsius was not used as a marketing name at the time of the GeForce 256's launch in 1999, the public name was first used by the nouveau Linux driver, and much later on the Nvidia website.

The company's naming convention using famous scientists for its microarchitectures only became standard practice starting with the Tesla/Fermi generations.

== Graphics features ==
Feature

- The transform and lighting hardware

API

- DirectX 7.0
- OpenGL 1.2 (1.5)

Memory

- Max VRAM size bumped to 128MB

== Chips ==
=== GeForce 256 ===
- NV10, 17 million transistor

=== GeForce 2 series ===
- NV11, 20 million transistor
- NV15, 25 million transistor
- NV17, 29 million transistor
- NV18, 29 million transistor
- Crush11, 20 million transistor
- Crush17, 29 million transistor

== GPU list ==
=== GeForce 256 ===
Model	Launch	Code name	Fab (nm)	Bus interface	Core clock (MHz)	Memory clock (MHz)	Core config^{1}	Fillrate				Memory				Processing power (GFLOPS)
Model	Launch	Code name	Fab (nm)	Bus interface	Core clock (MHz)	Memory clock (MHz)	Core config^{1}	MOperations/s	MPixels/s	MTexels/s	MVertices/s	Size (MB)	Bandwidth (GB/s)	Bus type	Bus width (bit)	Single precision
GeForce 256 SDR	11 October 1999	NV10	TSMC 220 nm	AGP 4× PCI	120	166	4:4:4	480	480	480	0	32 64	2.656	SDR	128	50
GeForce 256 DDR	13 December 1999	NV10	TSMC 220 nm	AGP 4× PCI	120	150	4:4:4	480	480	480	0	32 64	4.8	DDR	128	50

=== GeForce 2 series ===
Model	Launch	Code name	Fab (nm)	Bus interface	Core clock (MHz)	Memory clock (MHz)	Core config^{1}	Fillrate				Memory			
Model	Launch	Code name	Fab (nm)	Bus interface	Core clock (MHz)	Memory clock (MHz)	Core config^{1}	MOperations/s	MPixels/s	MTexels/s	MVertices/s	Size (MB)	Bandwidth (GB/s)	Bus type	Bus width (bit)
GeForce2 MX IGP + nForce 220/420	4 June 2001	NV1A (IGP) / NV11 (MX)	TSMC 180 nm	FSB	175	133	2:4:2	350	350	700	0	Up to 32 system RAM	2.128 4.256	DDR	64 128
GeForce2 MX200	3 March 2001	NV1A (IGP) / NV11 (MX)	TSMC 180 nm	AGP 4× PCI	175	166	2:4:2	350	350	700	0	32 64	1.328	SDR	64
GeForce2 MX	28 June 2000	NV1A (IGP) / NV11 (MX)	TSMC 180 nm	AGP 4× PCI	175	166	2:4:2	350	350	700	0	32 64	2.656	SDR	128
GeForce2 MX400	3 March 2001	NV1A (IGP) / NV11 (MX)	TSMC 180 nm	AGP 4× PCI	200	166,200 (SDR) 166 (DDR)	2:4:2	400	400	800	0	32 64	2.656, 3.200	SDR DDR	128 (SDR) 64 (DDR)
GeForce2 GTS	26 April 2000	NV15	TSMC 180 nm	AGP 4×	200	166	4:8:4	800	800	1600	0	32 64	5.312	DDR	128
GeForce2 Pro	5 December 2000	NV15	TSMC 180 nm	AGP 4×	200	200	4:8:4	800	800	1600	0	32 64	6.4	DDR	128
GeForce2 Ti	1 October 2001	NV15	TSMC 150 nm	AGP 4×	250	200	4:8:4	1000	1000	2000	0	32 64	6.4	DDR	128
GeForce2 Ultra	14 August 2000	NV16	TSMC 180 nm	AGP 4×	250	230	4:8:4	1000	1000	2000	0	64	7.36	DDR	128
Model	Launch	Code name	Fab (nm)	Bus interface	Core clock (MHz)	Memory clock (MHz)	Core config^{1}	MOperations/s	MPixels/s	MTexels/s	MVertices/s	Size (MB)	Bandwidth (GB/s)	Bus type	Bus width (bit)
Model	Launch	Code name	Fab (nm)	Bus interface	Core clock (MHz)	Memory clock (MHz)	Core config^{1}	Fillrate				Memory			

== See also ==
- List of Nvidia graphics processing units
- Scalable Link Interface (SLI)
- Qualcomm Adreno
