= Kelvin (microarchitecture) =

GPU microarchitecture by Nvidia

Nvidia Kelvin
- Release date: 2001-2003 2001
- Architecture: Kelvin
- Fabrication process: 150 nm

API support
- Direct3D: 8.0
- OpenGL: 1.2 (1.5)

History
- Predecessor: Celsius
- Successor: Rankine

Support status
- Unsupported

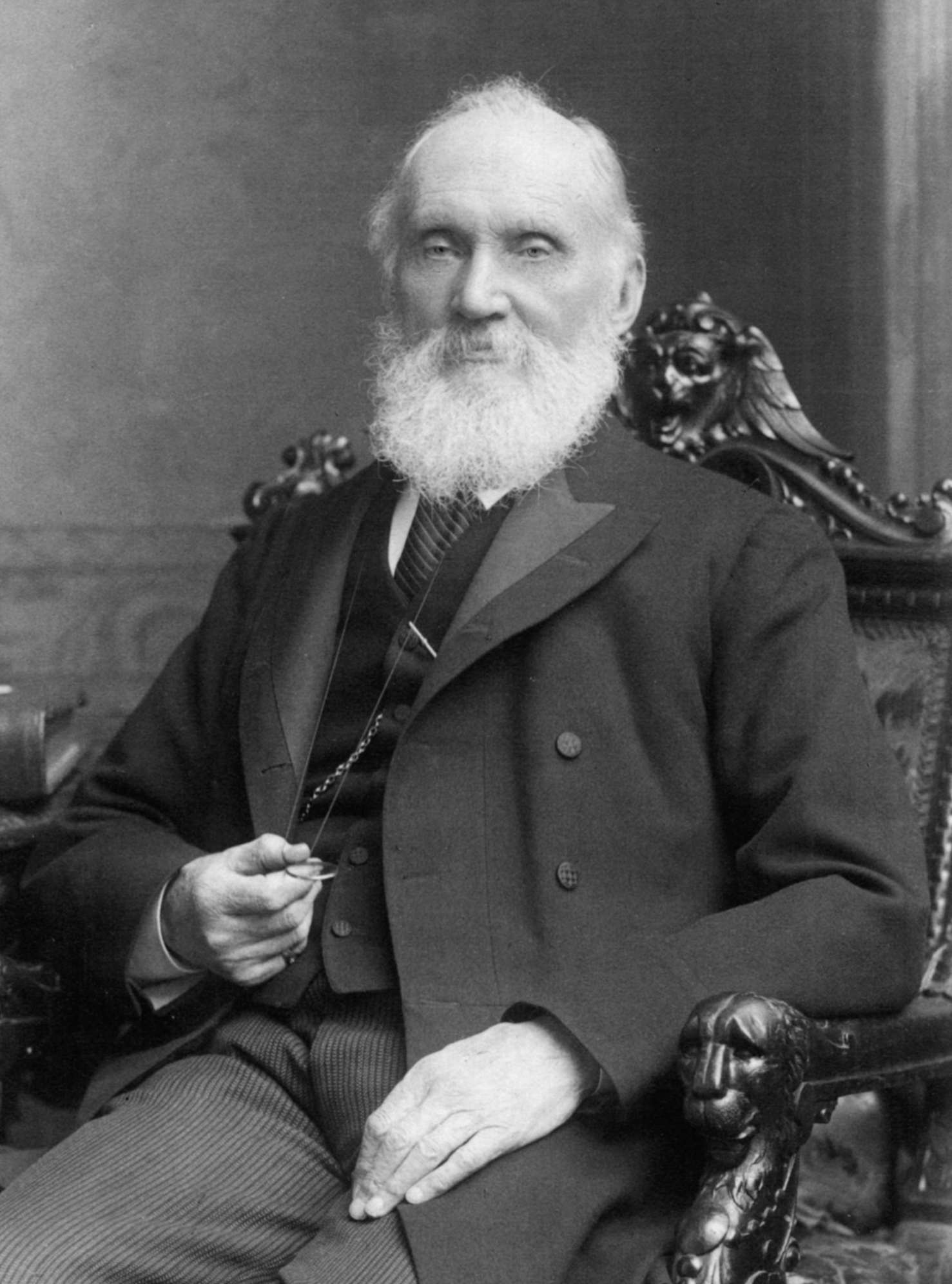
Photo of Lord Kelvin, eponym of architecture

Kelvin is the codename for a GPU microarchitecture developed by Nvidia, and released in 2001, as the successor to the Celsius microarchitecture. It was named with reference to William Thomson, 1st Baron Kelvin and used with the GeForce 3 and 4 series.

While Kelvin was not used as a marketing name at the time of the GeForce3's launch in 2001, the public name was first used by the nouveau Linux driver, and later on the Nvidia website.

== Graphics features ==
- DirectX 8.0 (8.1 in the original Xbox)
- OpenGL 1.2 (1.5; 1.4 in the original Xbox)
- Shader Model 1.3
- Vertex Shader 1.1
- Max VRAM size bumped to 128MB
- New memory controller with Z compression

== Chips ==
=== GeForce 3 (3xxx) series ===
- NV20, 57 million transistor

=== GeForce 4 (4xxx) series ===
- Crush11, 20 million transistor
- NV17, 29 million transistor
- NV18, 29 million transistor
- NV25, 63 million transistor
- NV28, 63 million transistor
- NV2A (Xbox GPU), 57 million transistor (Note: Though the NV2A is based on the GeForce 3 series, performance is closer to that of the GeForce 4 series due to the added vertex shaders despite having a lower clock rate of 233 MHz (for comparison, the equivalent GeForce4 Ti4200 (NV25/NV28) is clocked at 250 MHz).)

== GPU list ==
=== GeForce 3 (3xxx) series ===
Model	Launch	Code name	Fab (nm)	Bus interface	Core clock (MHz)	Memory clock (MHz)	Core config^{1}	Fillrate				Memory			
Model	Launch	Code name	Fab (nm)	Bus interface	Core clock (MHz)	Memory clock (MHz)	Core config^{1}	MOperations/s	MPixels/s	MTexels/s	MVertices/s	Size (MB)	Bandwidth (GB/s)	Bus type	Bus width (bit)
GeForce3 Ti200	1 October 2001	NV20	TSMC 150 nm	AGP 4× PCI	175	200	4:1:8:4	700	700	1400	42.75	64 128	6.4	DDR	128
GeForce3	27 February 2001	NV20	TSMC 150 nm	AGP 4× PCI	200	230	4:1:8:4	800	800	1600	50	64	7.36	DDR	128
GeForce3 Ti500	1 October 2001	NV20	TSMC 150 nm	AGP 4× PCI	240	250	4:1:8:4	960	960	1920	60	64	8	DDR	128

=== GeForce 4 (4xxx) series ===
Model	Launch	Code name	Fab (nm)	Bus interface	Core clock (MHz)	Memory clock (MHz)	Core config^{1}	Fillrate				Memory				Supported API version	
Model	Launch	Code name	Fab (nm)	Bus interface	Core clock (MHz)	Memory clock (MHz)	Core config^{1}	MOperations/s	MPixels/s	MTexels/s	MVertices/s	Size (MB)	Bandwidth (GB/s)	Bus type	Bus width (bit)	Direct3D	OpenGL
GeForce4 MX IGP + nForce2	1 October 2002	NV1F	TSMC 150 nm	FSB	250	133 200	2:0:4:2	500	500	1000	0	Up to 128 system RAM	2.128 6.4	DDR	64 128	7.0	1.2
GeForce4 MX420	6 February 2002	NV17	TSMC 150 nm	AGP 4× PCI	250	166	2:0:4:2	500	500	1000	0	64	2.656	SDR DDR	128 (SDR) 64 (DDR)	7.0	1.2
GeForce4 MX440 SE	2002	NV17	TSMC 150 nm	AGP 4× PCI	250	166	2:0:4:2	500	500	1000	0	64 128	5.312	DDR	128	7.0	1.2
GeForce MX4000	14 December 2003	NV18B	TSMC 150 nm	AGP 8× PCI	250	166	2:0:4:2	500	500	1000	0	64 128	2.656	DDR	64	7.0	1.2
GeForce PCX4300	19 February 2004	NV18B	TSMC 150 nm	PCIe ×16	250	166	2:0:4:2	500	500	1000	0	128	2.656	DDR	64	7.0	1.2
GeForce4 MX440	6 February 2002	NV17	TSMC 150 nm	AGP 4× PCI	275	200	2:0:4:2	550	550	1100	0	64 128	6.4	DDR	128	7.0	1.2
GeForce4 MX440 8x	25 September 2002	NV18	TSMC 150 nm	AGP 8× PCI	275	250	2:0:4:2	550	550	1100	0	64 128	8	DDR	128	7.0	1.2
GeForce4 MX460	6 February 2002	NV17	TSMC 150 nm	AGP 4× PCI	300	275	2:0:4:2	600	600	1200	0	64 128	8	DDR	128	7.0	1.2
GeForce4 Ti4200	16 April 2002	NV25	TSMC 150 nm	AGP 4×	250	222 (128 MB) 250 (64 MB)	4:2:8:4	1000	1000	2000	125	64 128	7.104 (128 MB) 8 (64 MB)	DDR	128	8.0a	1.3
GeForce4 Ti4200 8x	25 September 2002	NV28	TSMC 150 nm	AGP 8×	250	250	4:2:8:4	1000	1000	2000	125	128	8	DDR	128	8.0a	1.3
GeForce4 Ti4400	6 February 2002	NV25	TSMC 150 nm	AGP 4×	275	275	4:2:8:4	1100	1100	2200	137.5	128	8.8	DDR	128	8.0a	1.3
GeForce4 Ti4400 8x (Ti4800SE^{2})	20 January 2003	NV28	TSMC 150 nm	AGP 8×	275	275	4:2:8:4	1100	1100	2200	137.5	128	8.8	DDR	128	8.0a	1.3
GeForce4 Ti4600	6 February 2002	NV25	TSMC 150 nm	AGP 4×	300	325	4:2:8:4	1200	1200	2400	150	128	10.4	DDR	128	8.0a	1.3
GeForce4 Ti4600 8x (Ti4800^{3})	20 January 2003	NV28	TSMC 150 nm	AGP 8×	300	325	4:2:8:4	1200	1200	2400	150	128	10.4	DDR	128	8.0a	1.3
Model	Launch	Code name	Fab (nm)	Bus interface	Core clock (MHz)	Memory clock (MHz)	Core config^{1}	Fillrate				Memory				Supported API version	
Model	Launch	Code name	Fab (nm)	Bus interface	Core clock (MHz)	Memory clock (MHz)	Core config^{1}	MOperations/s	MPixels/s	MTexels/s	MVertices/s	Size (MB)	Bandwidth (GB/s)	Bus type	Bus width (bit)	Direct3D	OpenGL

Model	Features	
Model	nFiniteFX II Engine	Video Processing Engine (VPE)
GeForce4 MX420	No	Yes
GeForce4 MX440 SE	No	Yes
GeForce4 MX4000	No	Yes
GeForce4 PCX4300	No	Yes
GeForce4 MX440	No	Yes
GeForce4 MX440 8X	No	Yes
GeForce4 MX460	No	Yes
GeForce4 Ti4200	Yes	No
GeForce4 Ti4200 8x	Yes	No
GeForce4 Ti4400	Yes	No
GeForce4 Ti4400 8x	Yes	No
GeForce4 Ti4600	Yes	No
GeForce4 Ti4600 8x	Yes	No

=== Console GPUs ===
Model	Launch	Code name	Fab (nm)	Bus interface	Core clock (MHz)	Memory clock (MHz)	Core config^{1,2,3}	Fillrate				Memory				Latest supported API version	
Model	Launch	Code name	Fab (nm)	Bus interface	Core clock (MHz)	Memory clock (MHz)	Core config^{1,2,3}	MOperations/s	MTexels/s	MPixels/s	MTri/s	Size (MB)	Bandwidth (GB/s)	Bus type	Bus width (bit)	Direct3D	OpenGL
XGPU (Xbox)	November 15, 2001	NV2A	TSMC 150 nm	Integrated	233	200	4:2:8:4^{1}	5,800	1,864	932	116.5	64	6.4	DDR	128	8.1	1.4

== See also ==
- List of eponyms of Nvidia GPU microarchitectures
- List of Nvidia graphics processing units
- Qualcomm Adreno
- Scalable Link Interface (SLI)
