= GeForce 4 series =

Series of GPUs by Nvidia

Nvidia GeForce 4 series
- Logo
- Release date: February 6, 2002; 24 years ago
- Codename: NV17, NV18, NV19, NV25, NV28
- Architecture: Kelvin

Cards
- Entry-level: MX
- Mid-range: Ti 4200, Ti 4400, Ti 4800 SE
- High-end: Ti 4600, Ti 4800

API support
- Direct3D: Direct3D 7.0 NV1x; Direct3D 8.1 NV2x; Vertex Shader 1.1; Pixel Shader 1.3
- OpenGL: OpenGL 1.3

History
- Predecessor: GeForce 3 series
- Successor: GeForce FX series

Support status
- Unsupported

The GeForce 4 series (codenames below) refers to the fourth generation of Nvidia's GeForce line of graphics processing units (GPUs). There are two different GeForce4 families, the high-performance Ti family (NV25), and the budget MX family (NV17). The MX family spawned a mostly identical GeForce4 Go (NV17M) family for the laptop market. All three families were announced in early 2002; members within each family were differentiated by core and memory clock speeds. In late 2002, there was an attempt to form a fourth family, also for the laptop market, the only member of it being the GeForce4 4200 Go (NV28M) which was derived from the Ti line.

== GeForce4 Ti ==
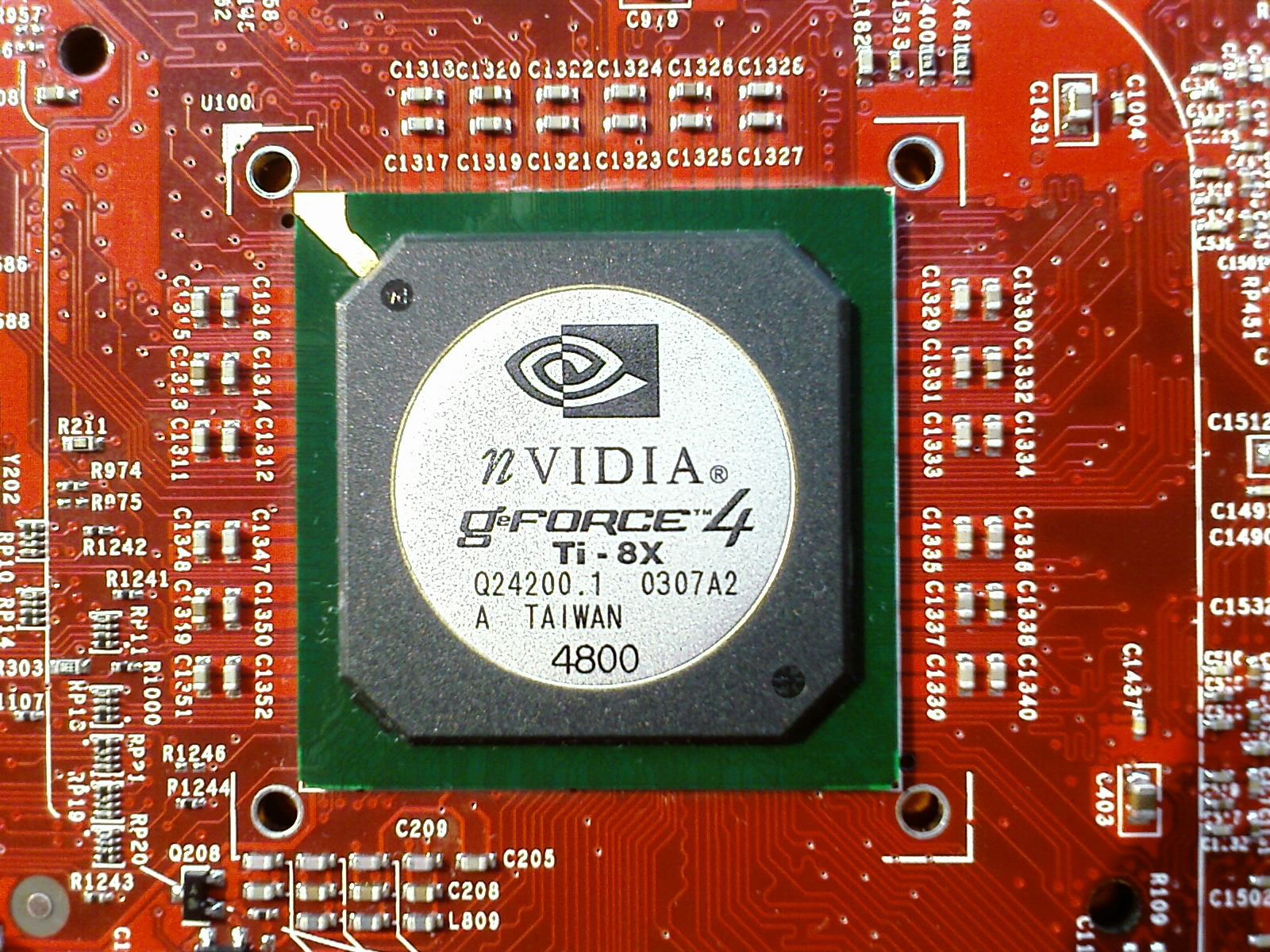
GeForce4 Ti 4800 (NV28 Ultra) GPU

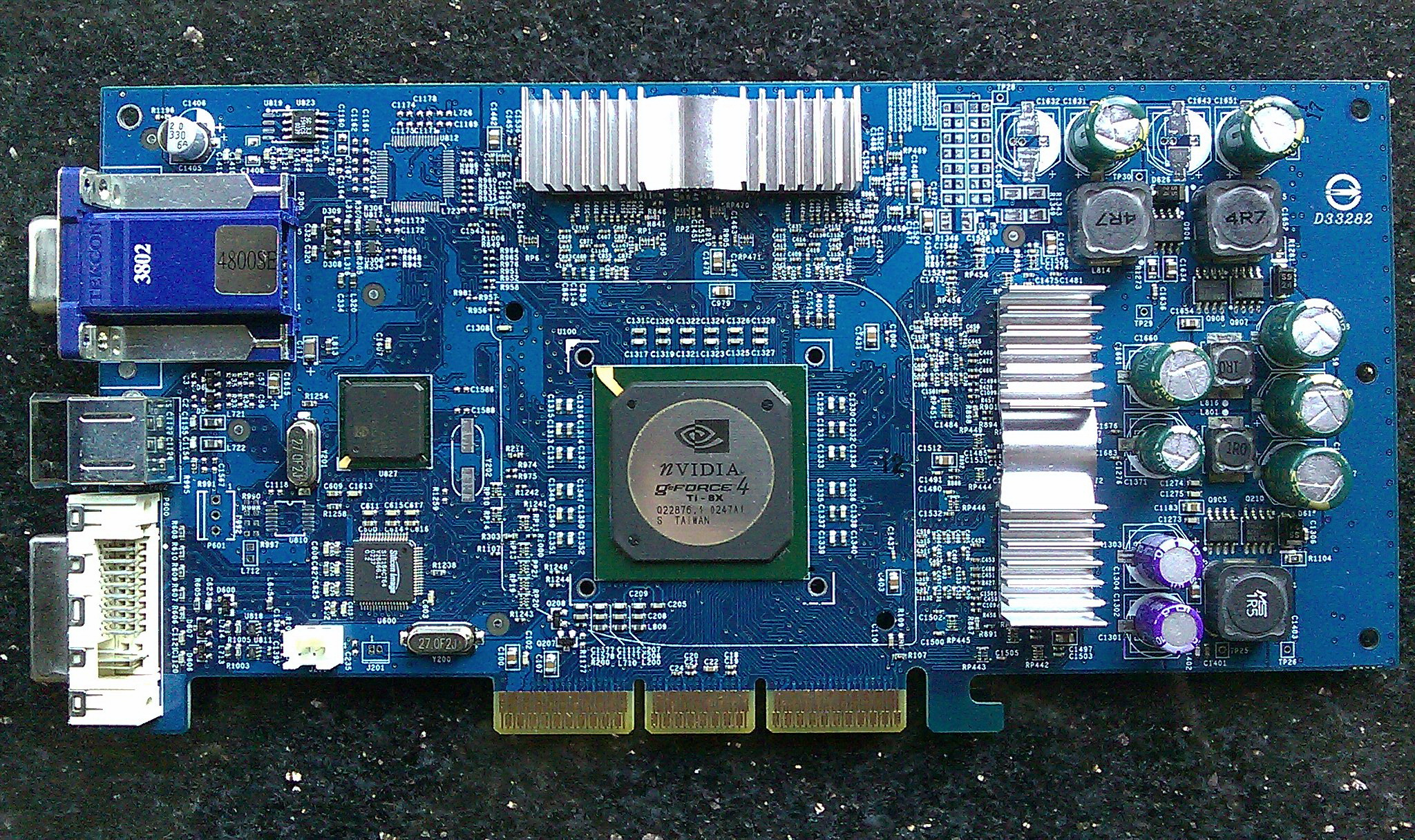
Albatron GeForce4 Ti 4800SE

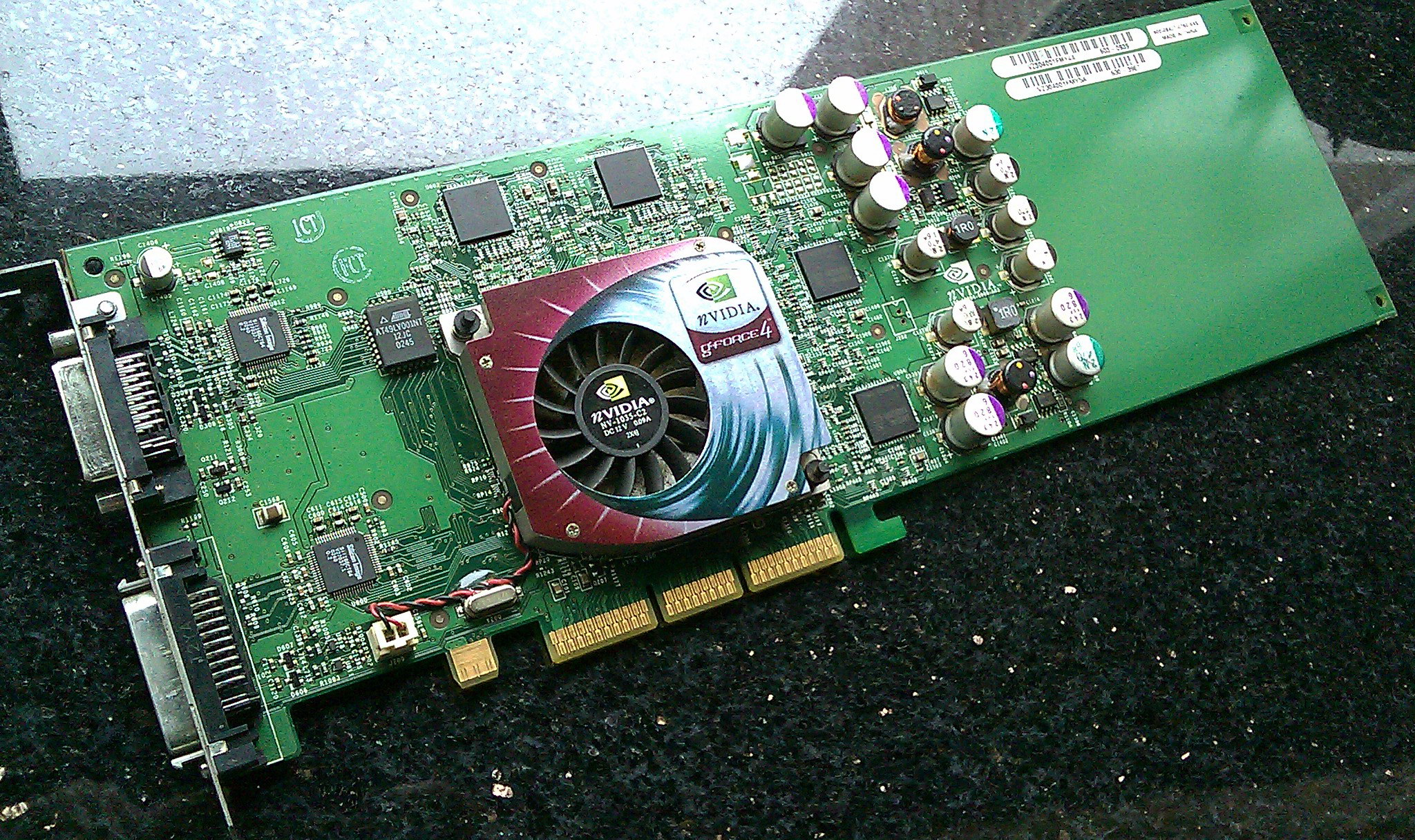
GeForce4 Ti 4600 Mac

=== Architecture ===
The GeForce4 Ti (NV25) was launched in February 2002 and was a revision of the GeForce 3 (NV20). It was very similar to its predecessor; the main differences were higher core and memory clock rates, a revised memory controller (known as Lightspeed Memory Architecture II/LMA II), Direct3D 8.1 support with up to Pixel Shader 1.3, an additional vertex shader (the vertex and pixel shaders were now known as nFinite FX Engine II), hardware anti-aliasing (Accuview AA), and DVD playback. Legacy Direct3D 7-class fixed-function T&L was now implemented as vertex shaders. Proper dual-monitor support (TwinView) was also brought over from the GeForce 2 MX. The GeForce 4 Ti was superior to the GeForce 4 MX in virtually every aspect save for higher production cost, although the MX had the Nvidia VPE (video processing engine) which the Ti lacked.

=== Lineup ===
The initial two models were the Ti4400 (US$299) and the top-of-the-range Ti4600 (US$399). At the time of their introduction, Nvidia's main products were the entry-level GeForce 2 MX, the midrange GeForce4 MX models (released the same time as the Ti4400 and Ti4600), and the older but still high-performance GeForce 3 (demoted to the upper mid-range or performance niche). However, ATI's Radeon 8500LE (9100) (a slower-clocked version of the flagship Radeon 8500) was somewhat cheaper than the Ti4400, and outperformed its price competitors, the GeForce 3 Ti200 and GeForce4 MX 460. The GeForce 3 Ti500 (US$299 prior to the GeForce4 release) was rendered obsolete quickly as it could not be produced cheap enough to justify a further price drop, though it filled the performance gap between the GeForce 3 Ti200 and the GeForce4 Ti4400.

In consequence, Nvidia rolled out a slightly cheaper model: the Ti4200. Although the 4200 was initially supposed to be part of the launch of the GeForce4 line, Nvidia had delayed its release to sell off the soon-to-be discontinued GeForce 3 Ti500 chips. In an attempt to prevent the Ti4200 damaging the Ti4400's sales, Nvidia set the Ti4200's memory speed at 222 MHz on the models with a 128 MiB frame buffer—a full 53 MHz slower than the Ti4400 (all of which had 128 MiB frame buffers). Models with a 64 MiB frame buffer were set to 250 MHz memory speed. This tactic didn't work however, for two reasons. Firstly, the Ti4400 was perceived as being not good enough for those who wanted top performance (who preferred the Ti4600), nor those who wanted good value for money (who typically chose the Ti4200), causing the Ti4400 to fade into obscurity. Furthermore, some graphics card makers simply ignored Nvidia's guidelines for the Ti4200, and set the memory speed at 250 MHz on the 128 MiB models anyway.

Then in late 2002, the NV25 core was replaced by the NV28 core, which differed only by addition of AGP-8X support. The Ti4200 with AGP-8X support was based on this chip, and sold as the Ti4200-8X. A Ti4800SE replaced the Ti4400 and a Ti4800 replaced the Ti4600 respectively when the 8X AGP NV28 core was introduced on these.

The only mobile derivative of the Ti series was the GeForce4 4200 Go (NV28M), launched in late 2002. The solution featured the same feature-set and similar performance compared to the NV28-based Ti4200, although the mobile variant was clocked lower. It outperformed the Mobility Radeon 9000 by a large margin, as well as being Nvidia's first DirectX 8 laptop graphics solution. However, because the GPU was not designed for the mobile space, it had thermal output similar to the desktop part. The 4200 Go also lacked power-saving circuitry like the MX-based GeForce4 4x0 Go series or the RV250-based Mobility Radeon 9000. This caused problems for notebook manufacturers, especially with regards to battery life.

=== Performance ===
The GeForce4 Ti outperformed the older GeForce 3 by a significant margin. The competing ATI Radeon 8500 was generally faster than the GeForce 3 line, but was overshadowed by the GeForce 4 Ti in every area other than price and more advanced pixel shader (1.4) support. Nvidia, however, missed a chance to dominate the upper-range/performance segment by delaying the release of the Ti4200 and by not rolling out 128 MiB models quickly enough; otherwise the Ti4200 was cheaper and faster than the previous top-line GeForce 3 Ti500 and Radeon 8500. Besides the late introduction of the Ti4200, the limited release 128 MiB models of the GeForce 3 Ti200 proved unimpressive, letting the Radeon 8500LE and even the full 8500 dominated the upper-range performance for a while. The Matrox Parhelia, despite having several DirectX 9.0 capabilities and other innovative features, was at most competitive with the GeForce 3 and GeForce 4 Ti 4200, but it was priced the same as the Ti 4600 at US$399.

The GeForce 4 Ti4200 enjoyed considerable longevity compared to its higher-clocked peers. Debuting at half the cost of the 4600 (US$199 versus US$399), the 4200 remained the best balance between price and performance until the launch of the short-lived DirectX 9 ATI Radeon 9500 Pro at the end of 2002. The Ti4200 still managed to hold its own against several next generation DirectX 9 compliant GPUs released in late 2003, outperforming the GeForce FX 5200 and the midrange FX 5600, and performing similarly to the mid-range Radeon 9600 Pro (ATI's permanent successor to the Radeon 9500 Pro) in some situations.

== GeForce4 MX ==
=== Architecture ===
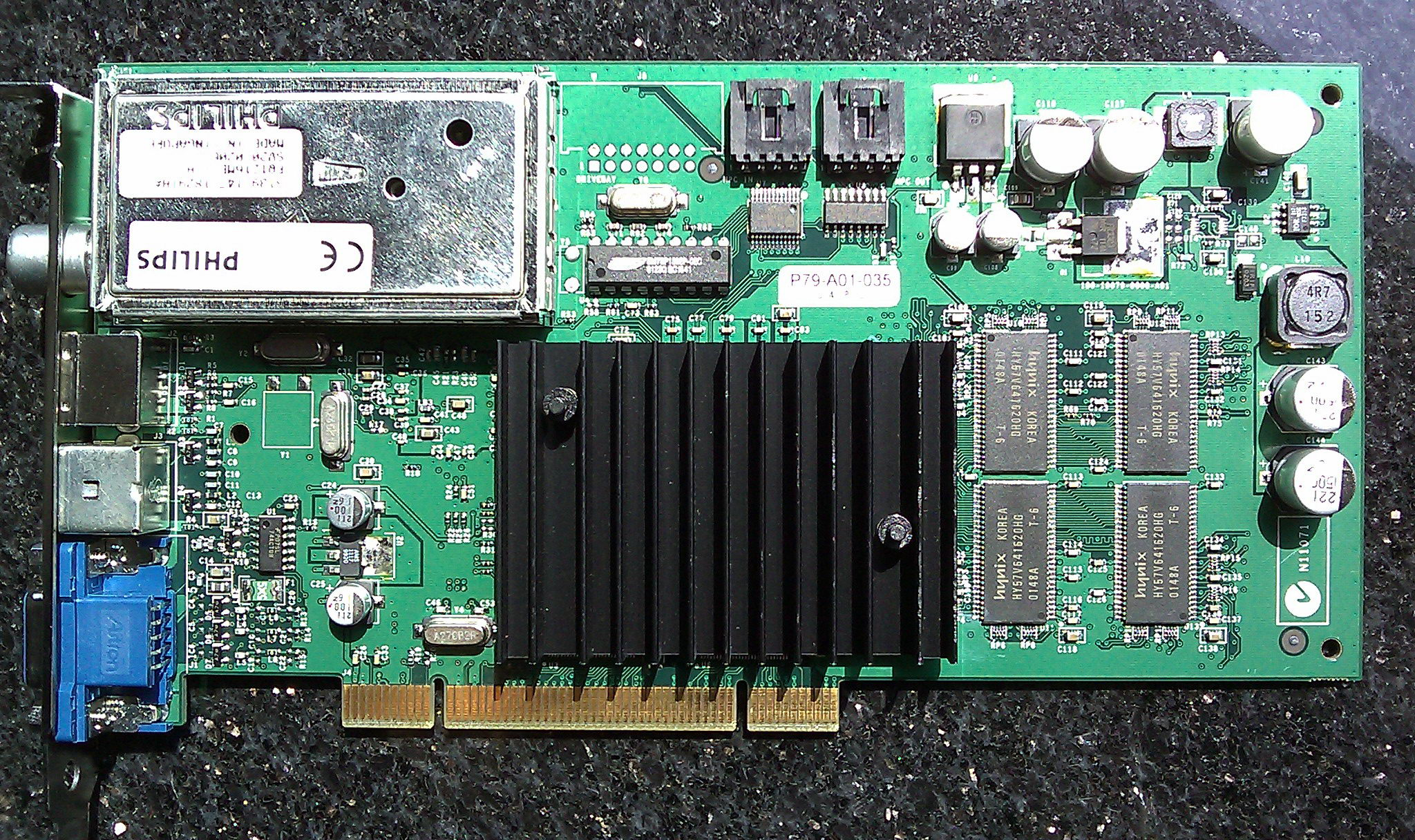
GeForce4 MX420

Though its lineage was of the past-generation GeForce2 (NV11 and NV15), the GeForce4 MX (NV17) did incorporate bandwidth and fill rate-saving techniques, dual-monitor support, and a multi-sampling anti-aliasing unit from the Ti series (NV25); the improved 128-bit DDR memory controller was crucial to solving the bandwidth limitations that plagued the GeForce 256 (NV10) and GeForce2 lines. It also owed some of its design heritage to Nvidia's high-end CAD products, and in performance-critical non-game applications it was remarkably effective. The most notable example is AutoCAD, in which the GeForce4 MX returned results within a single-digit percentage of GeForce4 Ti cards several times the price.

Many criticized the GeForce4 MX name as a misleading marketing ploy since it was less advanced than the preceding GeForce3 (NV20). In the features comparison chart between the Ti and MX lines, it showed that the only "feature" that was missing on the MX was the nfiniteFX II engine—the DirectX 8 programmable vertex and pixel shaders. However, the GeForce4 MX was not a GeForce4 Ti with the shader hardware removed, as the MX's performance in games that did not use shaders was considerably behind the Ti.

In motion-video applications, the GeForce4 MX offered new functionality. It (and not the GeForce4 Ti) was the first GeForce member to feature the Nvidia VPE (video processing engine). It was also the first GeForce to offer hardware-iDCT and VLC (variable length code) decoding, making VPE a major upgrade from Nvidia's previous HDVP. In the application of MPEG-2 playback, VPE could finally compete head-to-head with ATI's video engine.

=== Lineup ===
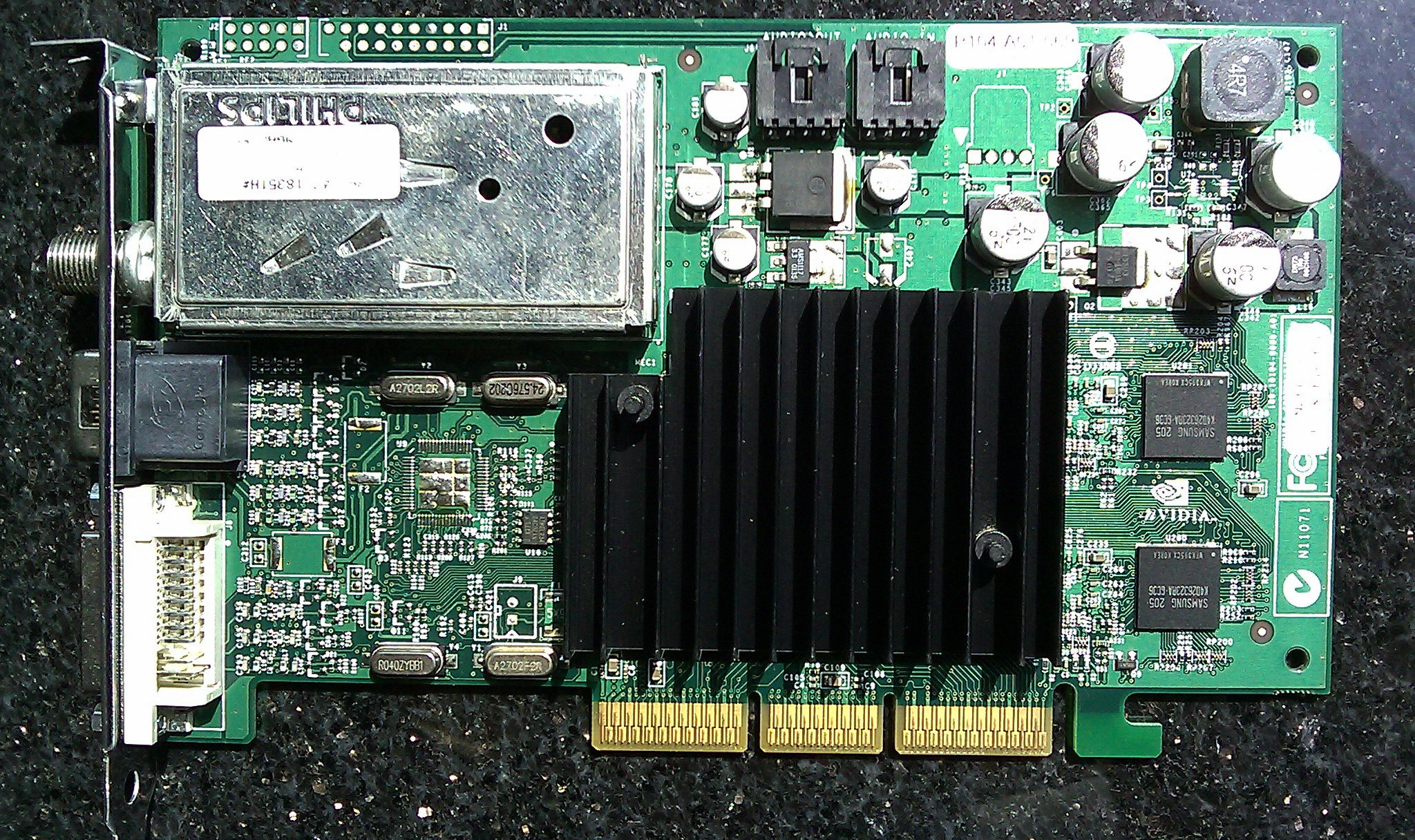
GeForce4 MX440

There were three initial models: the MX420, the MX440 and the MX460. The MX420 had only Single Data Rate (SDR) memory and was designed for very low end PCs, replacing the GeForce2 MX100 and MX200. The GeForce4 MX440 was a mass-market OEM solution, replacing the GeForce2 MX/MX400 and GeForce2 Ti. The GeForce4 MX460 was initially meant to slot in between the MX440 and the Ti4400, while the release of the Ti4200 was held back.

In terms of 3D performance, the MX420 performed only slightly better than the GeForce2 MX400 and below the GeForce2 GTS. However, this was never really much of a problem, considering its target audience. The nearest thing to a direct competitor the MX420 had was ATI's Radeon 7000. In practice its main competitors were chipset-integrated graphics solutions, such as Intel's 845G and Nvidia's own nForce 2, but its main advantage over those was multiple-monitor support; Intel's solutions did not have this at all, and the nForce 2's multi-monitor support was much inferior to what the MX series offered.

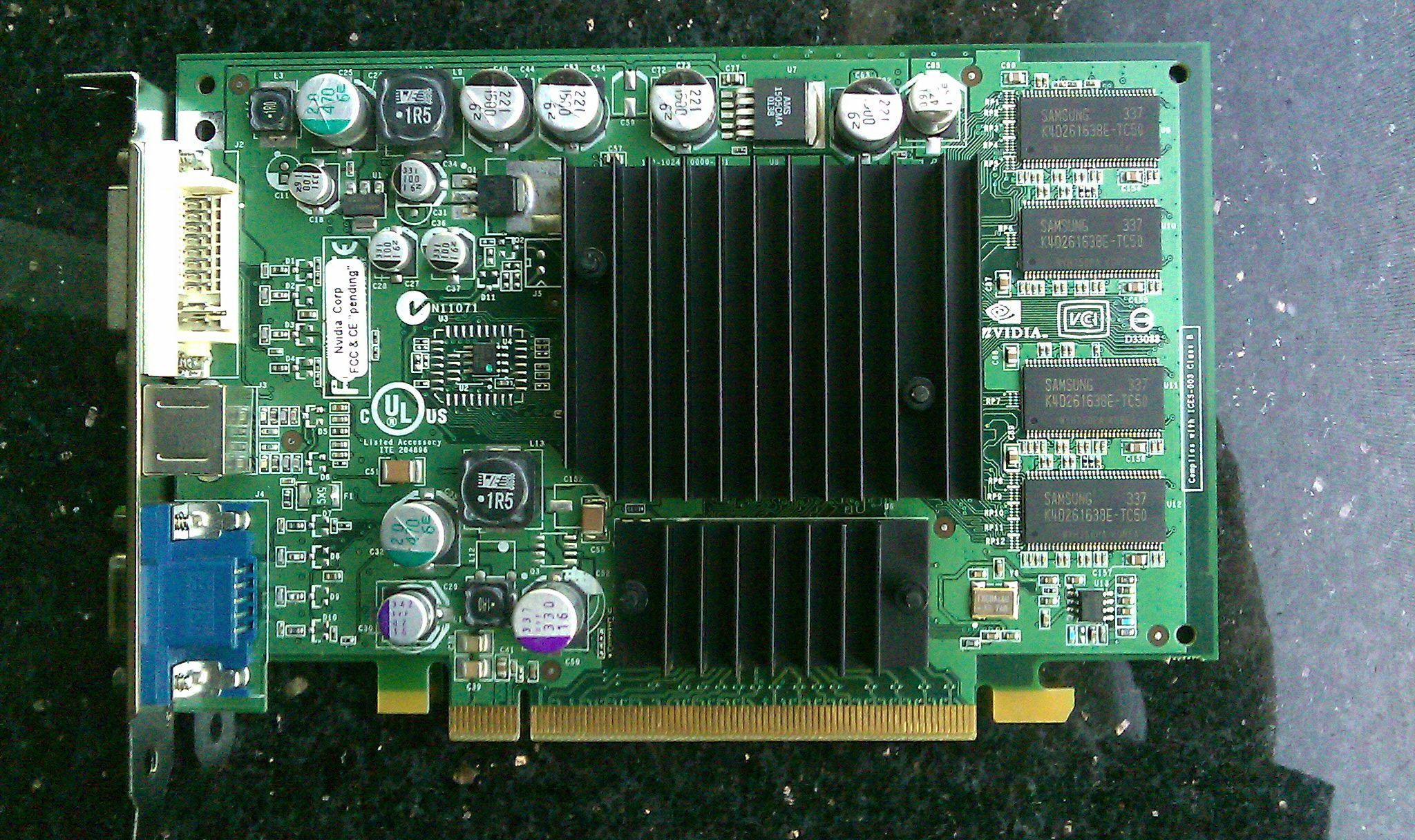
NVIDIA GeForce PCX 4300

The MX440 performed reasonably well for its intended audience, outperforming its closest competitor, the ATI Radeon 7500, as well as the discontinued GeForce2 Ti. Despite harsh criticism by gaming enthusiasts, the MX440 was successful in the PC OEM market as a replacement for the GeForce2 MX. Priced about 30% above the GeForce2 MX, it provided better performance, the ability to play a number of popular games that the GeForce2 could not run well—above all else—to the average non-specialist it sounded as if it were a "real" GeForce4—i.e., a GeForce4 Ti. While John Carmack initially warned gamers not to purchase the GeForce 4 MX440, its somewhat widespread adoption compelled id Software to make it the only DirectX 7.0 GPU supported by Doom 3. When ATI launched its Radeon 9000 Pro in September 2002, it performed about the same as the MX440, but had crucial advantages with better single-texturing performance and proper support of DirectX 8 shaders. However, the 9000 was unable to break the MX440's entrenched hold on the OEM market. Nvidia's eventual answer to the Radeon 9000 was the GeForce FX 5200, but despite the 5200's DirectX 9 features it did not have a significant performance increase compared to the MX440 even in DirectX 7.0 games. This kept the MX440 in production while the 5200 was discontinued.

One of the fastest DirectX 7.0 compliant GPUs, the MX460's performance was similar to the discontinued GeForce 2 Ultra and the existing GeForce3 Ti200 (the remaining available member of the GeForce 3 family). However, ATI released the Radeon 8500LE which outperformed its price competitors, the GeForce 3 Ti200 and GeForce4 MX 460. ATI's move in turn compelled Nvidia to roll out the Ti4200 earlier than planned, also at a similar price to the MX 460, and soon afterwards discontinuing the Ti200. The Ti200, 8500LE, and Ti4200 were all DirectX 8.0 compliant while having similar market pricing to the MX460, while the 8500LE and Ti4200 also provided significantly better performance than the MX460, prevented the MX460 from ever being popular compared to the other GeForce 4 MX releases.

The GeForce4 Go was derived from the MX line and it was announced along with the rest of the GeForce4 Ti and MX lineup in early 2002. There was the 420 Go, 440 Go, and 460 Go. However, ATI had beaten them to the market with the similarly performing Mobility Radeon 7500, and later the DirectX 8.0 compliant Mobility Radeon 9000. (Despite its name, the short-lived 4200 Go (NV28M) is not part of this lineup, it was instead derived from the Ti line.)

Like the Ti series, the MX was also updated in late 2002 to support AGP-8X with the NV18 core. The two new models were the MX440-8X, which was clocked slightly faster than the original MX440, and the MX440SE, which had a narrower memory bus, and was intended as a replacement of sorts for the MX420. The MX460, which had been discontinued by this point, was never replaced. Another variant followed in late 2003—the MX 4000, which was a GeForce4 MX440SE with a slightly higher memory clock.

The GeForce4 MX line received a third and final update in 2004, with the PCX 4300, which was functionally equivalent to the MX 4000 but with support for PCI Express. In spite of its new codename (NV19), the PCX 4300 was in fact simply an NV18 core with a BR02 chip bridging the NV18's native AGP interface with the PCI-Express bus.

== GeForce4 model information ==
- All models are manufactured via TSMC 150 nm manufacturing process
- All models support nView

Model	Launch	Code name	Transistors (million)	Die size (mm^{2})	Bus interface	Core clock (MHz)	Memory clock (MHz)	Core config (Note: Pixel shaders: vertex shaders: texture mapping units: render output units)	Fillrate				Memory				Supported API version		Performance (GFLOPS FP32)	TDP (Watts)
Model	Launch	Code name	Transistors (million)	Die size (mm^{2})	Bus interface	Core clock (MHz)	Memory clock (MHz)	Core config	MOperations/s	MPixels/s	MTexels/s	MVertices/s	Size (MB)	Bandwidth (GB/s)	Bus type	Bus width (bit)	Direct3D	OpenGL	Performance (GFLOPS FP32)	TDP (Watts)
GeForce4 MX IGP + nForce2	October 1, 2002	NV1F	?	?	FSB	250	133; 200	2:0:4:2	500	500	1,000	125	Up to 128 system RAM	2.128; 6.4	DDR	64; 128	7.0	1.2	1.000	?
GeForce4 MX420	February 6, 2002	NV17	29	65	AGP 4x PCI	250	166	2:0:4:2	500	500	1,000	125	64	2.656	SDR; DDR	128 (SDR); 64 (DDR)	7.0	1.2	1.000	14
GeForce4 MX440 SE	2002	NV17	29	65	AGP 4x PCI	250	133; 166	2:0:4:2	500	500	500 1000	125	64; 128	2.128 5.312	DDR	64 128	7.0	1.2	1.000	13
GeForce MX4000	December 14, 2003	NV18B	29	65	AGP 8x PCI	250	166	2:0:4:2	500	500	1000	125	64; 128	2.656	DDR	64	7.0	1.2	1.000	14
GeForce PCX4300	February 19, 2004	NV18B	29	65	PCIe x16	250	166	2:0:4:2	500	500	1000	125	128	2.656	DDR	64	7.0	1.2	1.000	16
GeForce4 MX440	February 6, 2002	NV17	29	65	AGP 4x PCI	275	200	2:0:4:2	550	550	1,100	137.5	64; 128	6.4	DDR	128	7.0	1.2	1.100	18
GeForce4 MX440 8x	September 25, 2002	NV18	29	65	AGP 8x PCI	275	166; 250	2:0:4:2	550	550	1,100	137.5	64; 128	2.656; 8.0	DDR	64; 128	7.0	1.2	1.100	19
GeForce4 MX460	February 6, 2002	NV17	29	65	AGP 4x PCI	300	275	2:0:4:2	600	600	1,200	150	64; 128	8.8	DDR	128	7.0	1.2	1.200	22
GeForce4 Ti4200	April 16, 2002	NV25	63	142	AGP 4x	250	222 (128 MB); 250 (64 MB)	4:2:8:4	1,000	1,000	2,000	125	64; 128	7.104 (128 MB); 8.0 (64 MB)	DDR	128	8.1	1.3	15.00	33
GeForce4 Ti4200 8x	September 25, 2002	NV28	63	101	AGP 8x	250	250	4:2:8:4	1,000	1,000	2,000	125	64; 128	8.0	DDR	128	8.1	1.3	15.00	34
GeForce4 Ti4400	February 6, 2002	NV25	63	142	AGP 4x	275	275	4:2:8:4	1,100	1,100	2,200	137.5	128	8.8	DDR	128	8.1	1.3	16.50	37
GeForce4 Ti4400 8x (Ti4800SE (Note: GeForce4 Ti4400 8x: Card manufacturers utilizing this chip labeled the card as a Ti4800SE. The surface of the chip has "Ti-8x" printed on it.))	January 20, 2003	NV28	63	101	AGP 8x	275	275	4:2:8:4	1,100	1,100	2,200	137.5	128	8.8	DDR	128	8.1	1.3	16.50	38
GeForce4 Ti4600	February 6, 2002	NV25	63	142	AGP 4x	300	325	4:2:8:4	1,200	1,200	2,400	150	128	10.4	DDR	128	8.1	1.3	18.00	?
GeForce4 Ti4600 8x (Ti4800 (Note: GeForce4 Ti4600 8x: Card manufacturers utilizing this chip labeled the card as a Ti4600, and in some cases as a Ti4800. The surface of the chip has "Ti-8x" printed on it, as well as "4800" printed at the bottom.))	January 20, 2003	NV28	63	101	AGP 8x	300	325	4:2:8:4	1,200	1,200	2,400	150	128	10.4	DDR	128	8.1	1.3	18.00	43

Model	Features	
Model	nFiniteFX II Engine	Video Processing Engine (VPE)
GeForce4 MX420	No	Yes
GeForce4 MX440 SE	No	Yes
GeForce4 MX4000	No	Yes
GeForce4 PCX4300	No	Yes
GeForce4 MX440	No	Yes
GeForce4 MX440 8X	No	Yes
GeForce4 MX460	No	Yes
GeForce4 Ti4200	Yes	No
GeForce4 Ti4200 8x	Yes	No
GeForce4 Ti4400	Yes	No
GeForce4 Ti4400 8x	Yes	No
GeForce4 Ti4600	Yes	No
GeForce4 Ti4600 8x	Yes	No

=== GeForce4 Go mobile GPU series ===
- Mobile GPUs are either soldered to the mainboard or to some Mobile PCI Express Module (MXM).
- All models are made via 150 nm fabrication process

Model	Launch	Code name	Bus interface	Core clock (MHz)	Memory clock (MHz)	Core config (Note: Pixel shaders: vertex shaders: texture mapping units: render output units)	Fillrate				Memory				API support	
Model	Launch	Code name	Bus interface	Core clock (MHz)	Memory clock (MHz)	Core config	MOperations/s	MPixels/s	MTexels/s	MVertices/s	Size (MB)	Bandwidth (GB/s)	Bus type	Bus width (bit)	Direct3D	OpenGL
GeForce4 Go 410	February 6, 2002	NV17M	AGP 8x	200	200	2:0:4:2	400	400	800	0	16	1.6	SDR	64	7.0	1.2
GeForce4 Go 420	February 6, 2002	NV17M	AGP 8x	200	400	2:0:4:2	400	400	800	0	32	3.2	DDR	64	7.0	1.2
GeForce4 Go 440	February 6, 2002	NV17M	AGP 8x	220	440	2:0:4:2	440	440	880	0	64	7.04	DDR	128	7.0	1.2
GeForce4 Go 460	October 14, 2002	NV17M	AGP 8x	250	500	2:0:4:2	500	500	1000	0	64	8	DDR	128	7.0	1.2
GeForce4 Go 488		NV18M	AGP 8x	300	550	2:0:4:2	600	600	1200	0	64	8.8	DDR	128	7.0	1.2
GeForce4 Go 4200	November 14, 2002	NV28M	AGP 8x	200	400	4:2:8:4	800	800	1600	100	64	6.4	DDR	128	8.1	1.3

== GeForce4 Go driver support ==
This family is a derivative of the GeForce4 MX family, produced for the laptop market. The GeForce4 Go family, performance wise, can be considered comparable to the MX line.

One possible solution to the lack of driver support for the Go family is the third party Omega Drivers. Using third party drivers can, among other things, invalidate warranties. The Omega Drivers are supported by neither laptop manufacturers, laptop ODMs, nor by Nvidia. Nvidia attempted legal action against a version of Omega Drivers that included the Nvidia logo.

== Support ==
Nvidia has ceased driver support for GeForce 4 series.

=== Final drivers ===
- Windows 9x & Windows Me: 81.98 released on December 21, 2005; Download;

Product Support List Windows 95/98/Me – 81.98.
- Driver version 81.98 for Windows 9x/Me was the last driver version ever released by Nvidia for these systems; no new official releases were later made for these systems.

- Windows 2000, 32-bit Windows XP, 64-bit Windows XP & Media Center Edition: 93.71 released on November 2, 2006; Download.

- Also available: 93.81 (beta) released on November 28, 2006; Download.
- Note: Despite claims in the documentation that 94.24 (released on May 17, 2006) supports the Geforce 4 series, it does not (94.24 actually supports only GeForce 6 and GeForce 7 series).

- Linux/BSD/Solaris: 96.43.23 released on September 14, 2012; Download.

The drivers for Windows 2000/XP can also be installed on later versions of Windows such as Windows Vista and 7; however, they do not support desktop compositing or the Aero effects of these operating systems.

(Products supported list also on this page)

Windows 95/98/Me Driver Archive
Windows XP/2000 Driver Archive
Unix Driver Archive

== See also ==
- Graphics card
- Graphics processing unit
- Kelvin (microarchitecture)
