= GeForce 256 =

GPU by Nvidia

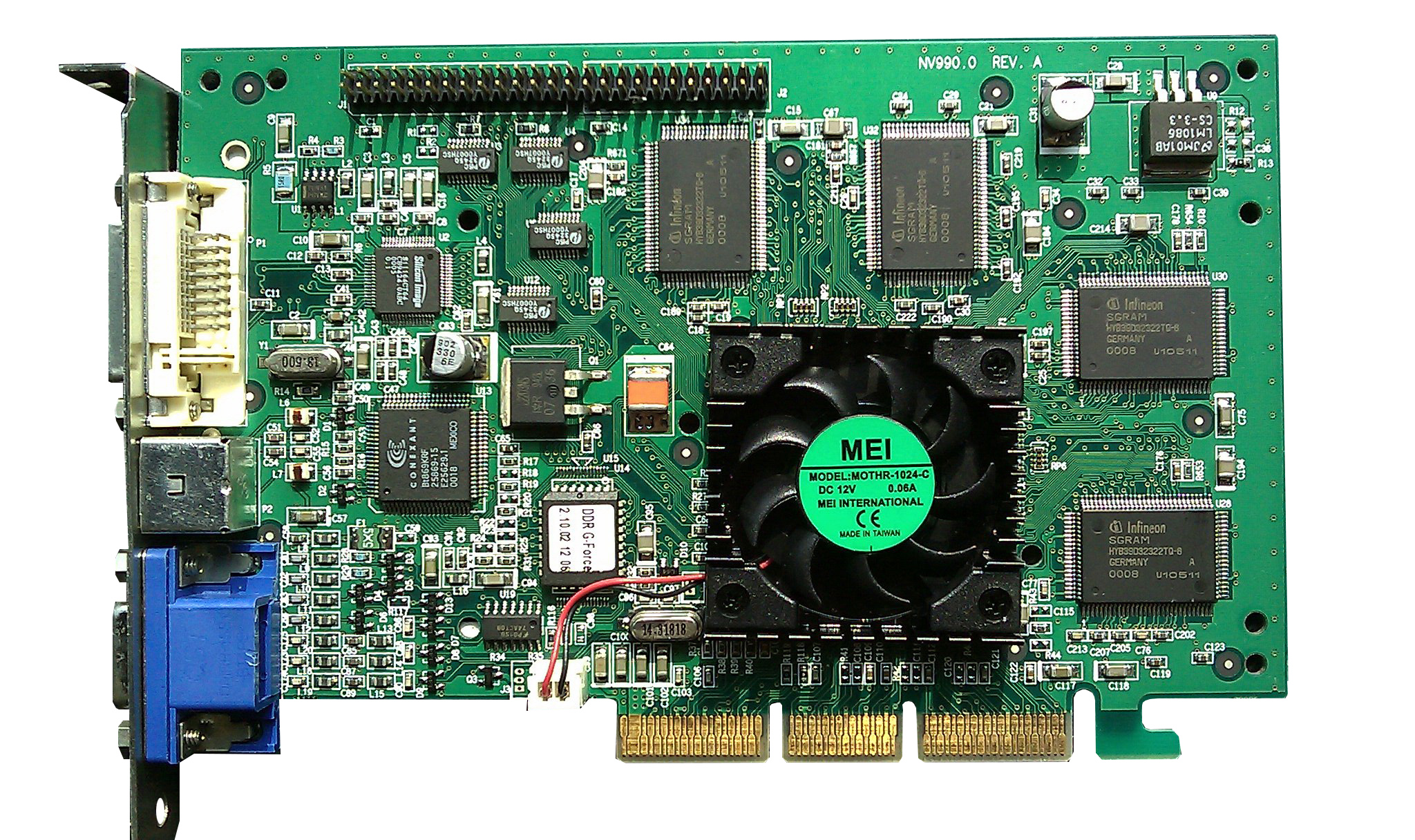
- Top: Logo; Bottom: Nvidia GeForce 256
- Release date: October 11, 1999; 26 years ago (SDR); December 13, 1999; 26 years ago (DDR)
- Codename: NV10
- Architecture: Celsius
- Fabrication process: TSMC 220 nm (CMOS)

Cards
- Mid-range: GeForce 256 SDR
- High-end: GeForce 256 DDR

API support
- Direct3D: Direct3D 7.0
- OpenGL: OpenGL 1.2.1 (T&L)

History
- Predecessor: RIVA TNT2
- Successor: GeForce 2 series

Support status
- Unsupported

The GeForce 256 is the original release in Nvidia's "GeForce" product line. Announced on August 31, 1999 and released on October 11, 1999, the GeForce 256 improves on its predecessor (RIVA TNT2) by increasing the number of fixed pixel pipelines, offloading host geometry calculations to a hardware transform and lighting (T&L) engine, and adding hardware motion compensation for MPEG-2 video. It offered a notable leap in 3D PC gaming performance and was the first fully Direct3D 7-compliant 3D accelerator.

== Architecture ==
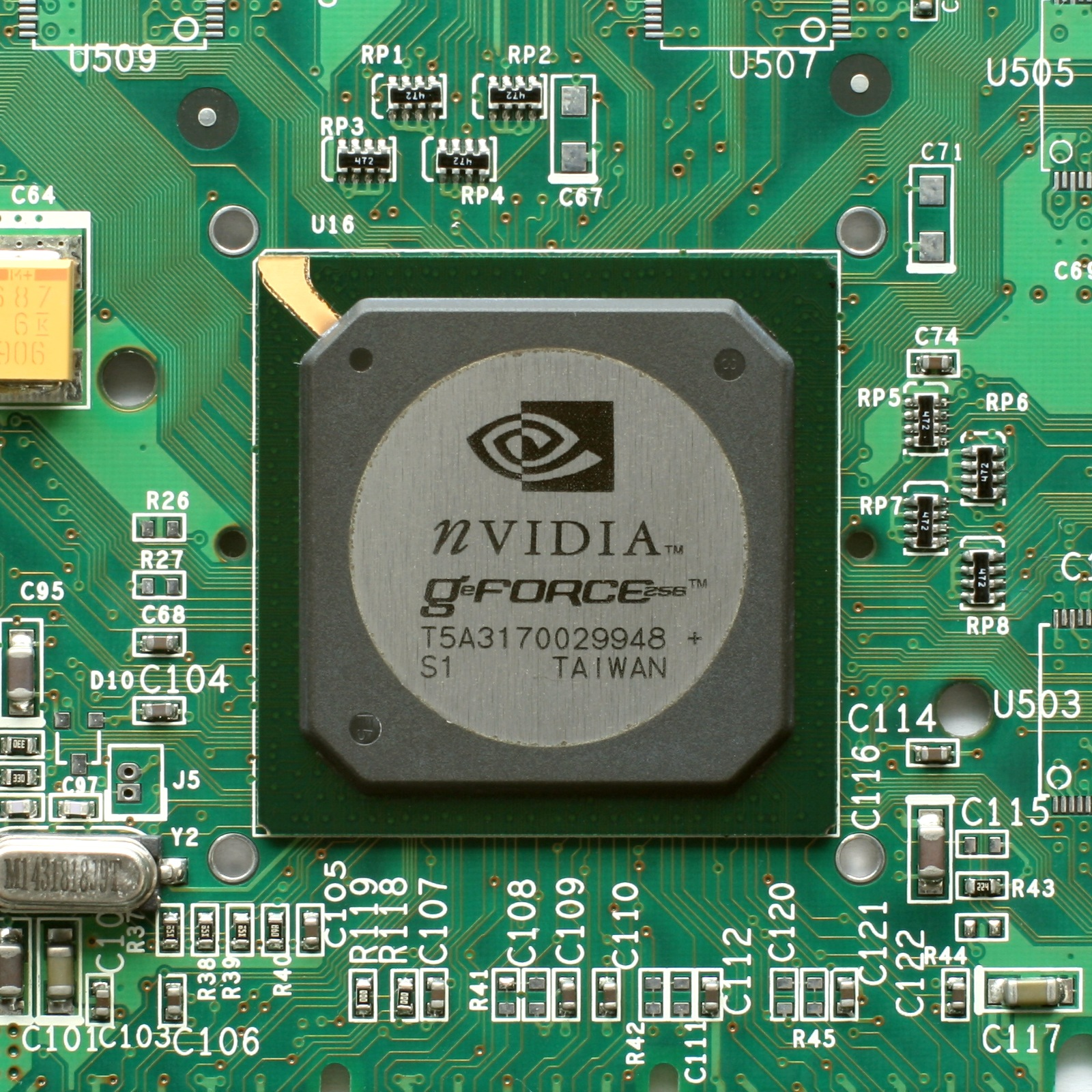
GeForce 256 (NV10) GPU

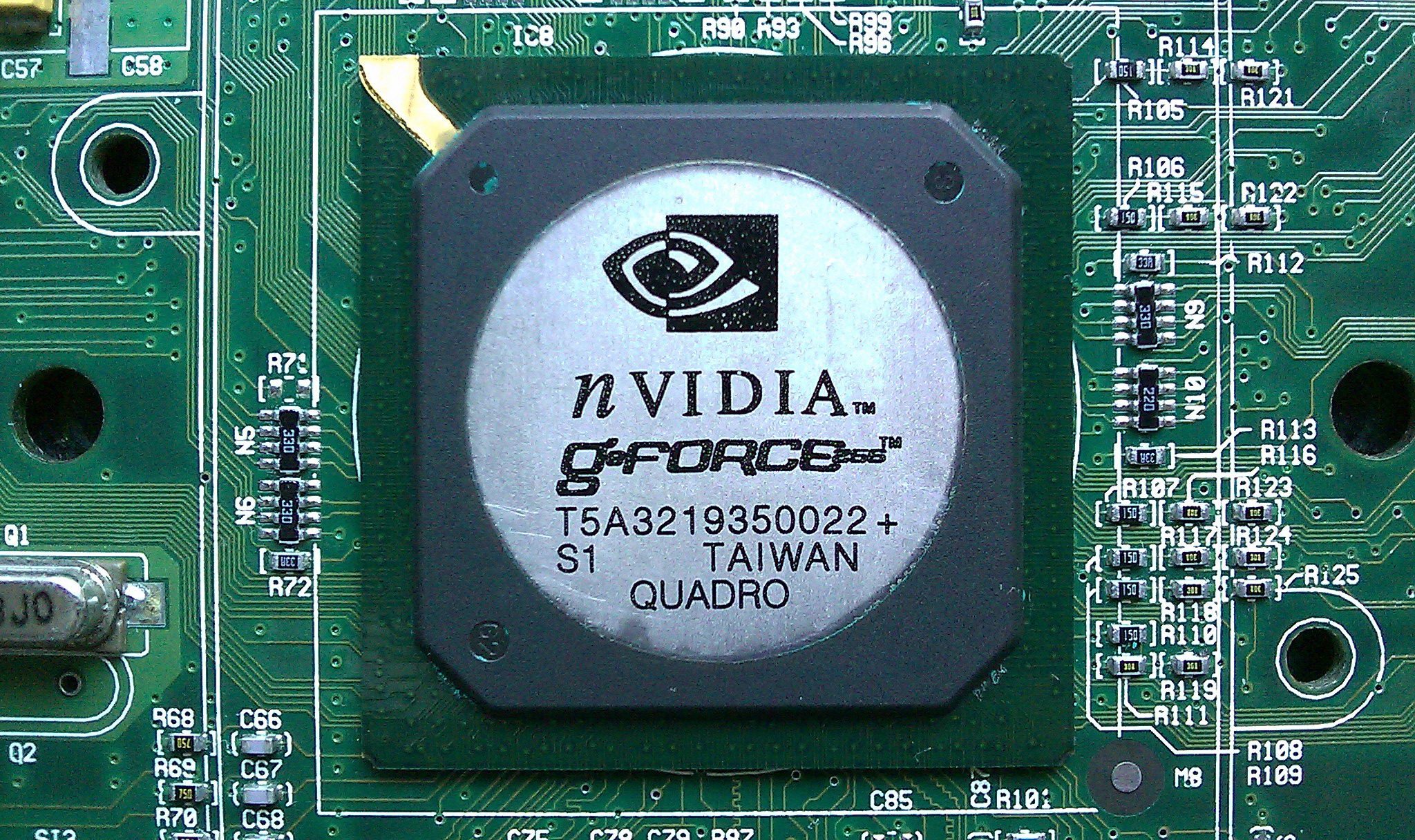
Quadro (NV10GL) GPU

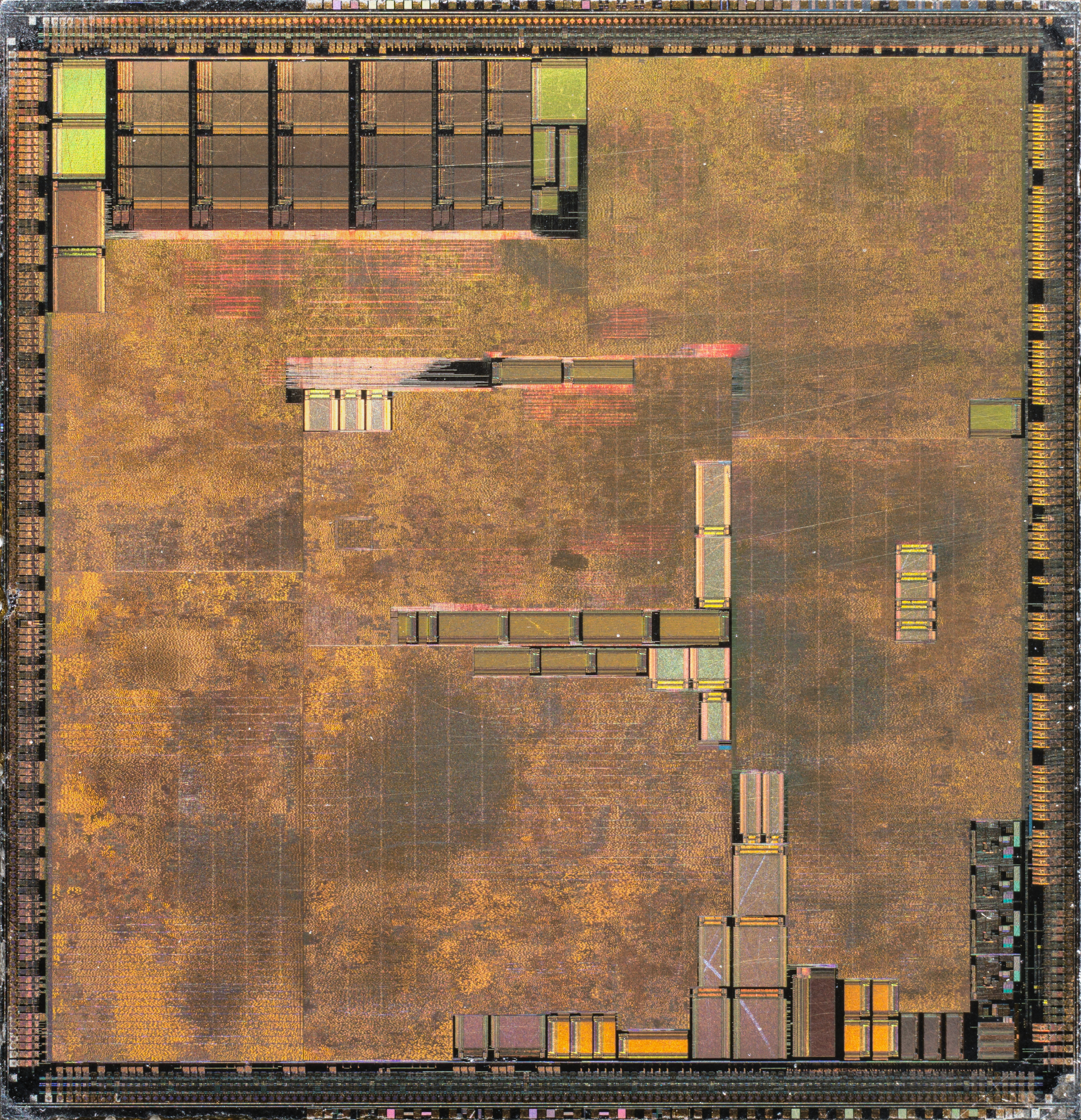
Die shot of an NV10 GPU

GeForce 256 was marketed as "the world's first 'GPU', or Graphics Processing Unit", a term Nvidia defined at the time as "a single-chip processor with integrated transform, lighting, triangle setup/clipping, and rendering engines that is capable of processing a minimum of 10 million polygons per second".

The "256" in its name stems from the "256-bit QuadPipe Rendering Engine", a term describing the four 64-bit pixel pipelines of the NV10 chip. In single-textured games NV10 could put out 4 pixels per cycle, while a two-textured scenario would limit this to 2 multitextured pixels per cycle, as the chip still had only one TMU per pipeline, just as TNT2. In terms of rendering features, GeForce 256 also added support for cube environment mapping and dot-product (Dot3) bump mapping.

The integration of the transform and lighting hardware into the GPU itself set the GeForce 256 apart from older 3D accelerators that relied on the CPU to perform these calculations (also known as software transform and lighting). This reduction of 3D graphics solution complexity brought the cost of such hardware to a new low and made it accessible to cheap consumer graphics cards instead of being limited to the previous expensive professionally oriented niche designed for computer-aided design (CAD). NV10's T&L engine also allowed Nvidia to enter the CAD market with dedicated cards for the first time, with a product called Quadro. The Quadro line uses the same silicon chips as the GeForce cards, but has different driver support and certifications tailored to the unique requirements of CAD applications.

The chip was manufactured by TSMC using its 220 nm CMOS process.

There was only one GeForce 256 release. Succeeding GeForce products would offer varying chip speeds at varying price points. However there were two memory configurations, with the SDR version released in October 1999 and the DDR version released in mid-December 1999 – each with a different type of SDRAM memory. The SDR version uses SDR SDRAM memory from Samsung Electronics, while the later DDR version uses DDR SDRAM memory from Hyundai Electronics (now SK Hynix).

== Product comparisons ==
Compared to previous high-end 3D game accelerators, such as 3dfx Voodoo3 3500 and Nvidia RIVA TNT2 Ultra, GeForce provided up to a 50% or greater improvement in frame rate in some games (ones specifically written to take advantage of the hardware T&L) when coupled with a very-low-budget CPU. The later release and widespread adoption of GeForce 2 MX/4 MX cards with the same feature set meant unusually long support for the GeForce 256, until approximately 2006, in games such as Star Wars: Empire at War or Half-Life 2, the latter of which featured a Direct3D 7-compatible path, using a subset of Direct3D 9 to target the fixed-function pipeline of these GPUs.

Without broad application support at the time, critics pointed out that the T&L technology had little real-world value. Initially, it was only somewhat beneficial in certain situations in a few OpenGL-based 3D first-person shooters, most notably Quake III Arena. Benchmarks using low-budget CPUs like the Celeron 300A would give favourable results for the GeForce 256, but benchmarks with fast CPUs such as the Pentium II 300 would give better results with some older graphics cards like the 3dfx Voodoo 2. 3dfx and other competing graphics-card companies pointed out that a fast CPU could more than make up for the lack of a T&L unit. Software support for hardware T&L was not commonplace until several years after the release of the first GeForce. Early drivers were buggy and slow, while 3dfx cards enjoyed efficient, high-speed, mature Glide API and/or MiniGL support for the majority of games. Only after the GeForce 256 was replaced by the GeForce 2, and ATI's T&L-equipped Radeon was released, did hardware T&L become widely utilized in games.

The GeForce 256 was also quite expensive for the time and didn't offer tangible advantages over competitors' products outside of 3D acceleration. For example, its GUI and video playback acceleration were not significantly better than that offered by competition or even older Nvidia products.

=== Motion compensation ===
The GeForce 256 introduced motion compensation as a functional unit of the NV10 chip, this first-generation unit would be succeeded by Nvidia's HDVP (High-Definition Video Processor) in GeForce 2 GTS.

== Specifications ==
- All models are made via TSMC 220 nm fabrication process

Model	Launch	Code name	Transistors (million)	Die size (mm^{2})	Bus interface	Core clock (MHz)	Memory clock (MHz)	Core config (Note: Pixel pipelines: texture mapping units: render output units)	Fillrate				Memory				Performance (MFLOPS FP32)	TDP (Watts)
Model	Launch	Code name	Transistors (million)	Die size (mm^{2})	Bus interface	Core clock (MHz)	Memory clock (MHz)	Core config	MOperations/s	MPixels/s	MTexels/s	MVertices/s	Size (MB)	Bandwidth (GB/s)	Bus type	Bus width (bit)	Performance (MFLOPS FP32)	TDP (Watts)
GeForce 256 SDR	Oct 11, 1999	NV10	17	139	AGP 4x, PCI	120	166	4:4:4	480	480	480	0	32; 64	2.656	SDR	128	960	13
GeForce 256 DDR	Dec 13, 1999	NV10	17	139	AGP 4x, PCI	120	150	4:4:4	480	480	480	0	32; 64	4.800	DDR	128	960	12

== Support ==
NVIDIA has ceased driver support for the GeForce 256 series.

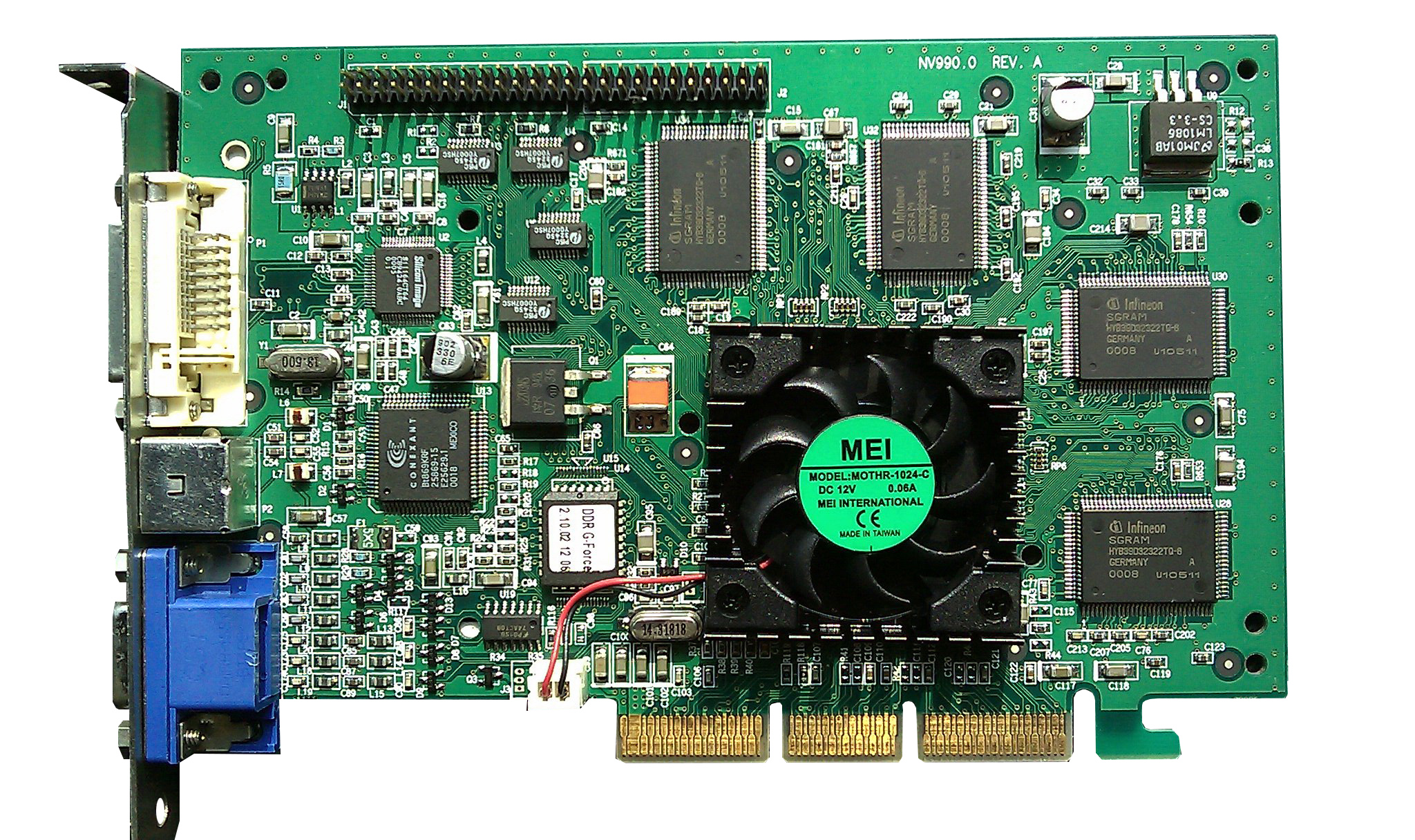
VisionTek GeForce 256 DDR

=== Final drivers ===
- Windows 9x & Windows Me: 71.84 released on March 11, 2005; Download;

Product Support List Windows 95/98/Me – 71.84.

- Windows 2000 & 32-bit Windows XP: 71.89 released on April 14, 2005; Download.

Product Support List Windows XP/2000 – 71.84.

The drivers for Windows 2000/XP may be installed on later versions of Windows such as Windows Vista and 7; however, they do not support desktop compositing or the Aero effects of these operating systems.

== Competitors ==
- ATI Rage 128 and Rage Fury MAXX
- 3dfx Voodoo3
- Matrox G400
- S3 Savage 2000

== See also ==
- Graphics card
- Graphics processing unit
- List of Nvidia graphics processing units
