= GeForce 2 series =

Series of GPUs by Nvidia

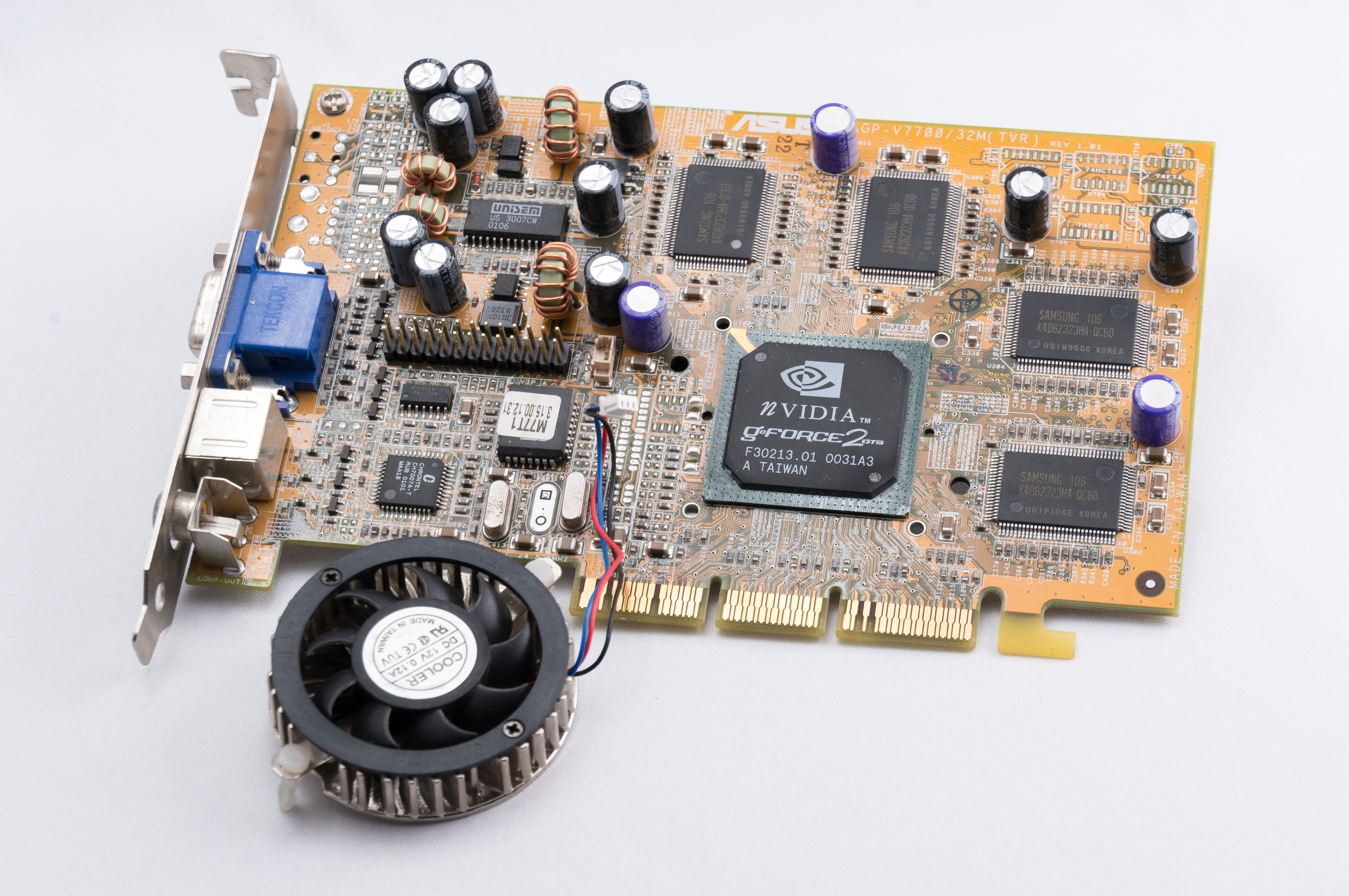
- Top: Logo of the GeForce 2 series Bottom: Nvidia GeForce 2 GTS (Asus-branded) with its cooler removed, showing the NV15 die
- Release date: mid-May, 2000; 26 years ago
- Codename: NV11, NV15, NV16
- Architecture: Celsius
- Models: GeForce MX series; GeForce GTS series; GeForce Pro series; GeForce Ti series; GeForce Ultra series

Cards
- Entry-level: MX
- Mid-range: GTS, Pro
- High-end: Ti, Ultra

API support
- Direct3D: Direct3D 7.0
- OpenGL: OpenGL 1.2 (T&L)

History
- Predecessor: GeForce 256
- Successor: GeForce 3 series

Support status
- Unsupported

The GeForce 2 series (NV15) is the second generation of Nvidia's GeForce line of graphics processing units (GPUs). Introduced in 2000, it is the successor to the GeForce 256.

The GeForce 2 family comprised a number of models. The GeForce 2 GTS, GeForce 2 Ultra, GeForce 2 Pro, and GeForce 2 Ti are based upon the original architecture (NV15), varying only by chip and memory clock speeds. For the low-end segment and OEMs, the GeForce 2 MX series (NV11) was created, from which the GeForce 2 Go was derived for laptops. In addition, the GeForce 2 architecture is used for the Quadro series on the Quadro 2 Pro, 2 MXR, and 2 EX cards with special drivers meant to accelerate computer-aided design applications.

== Architecture ==
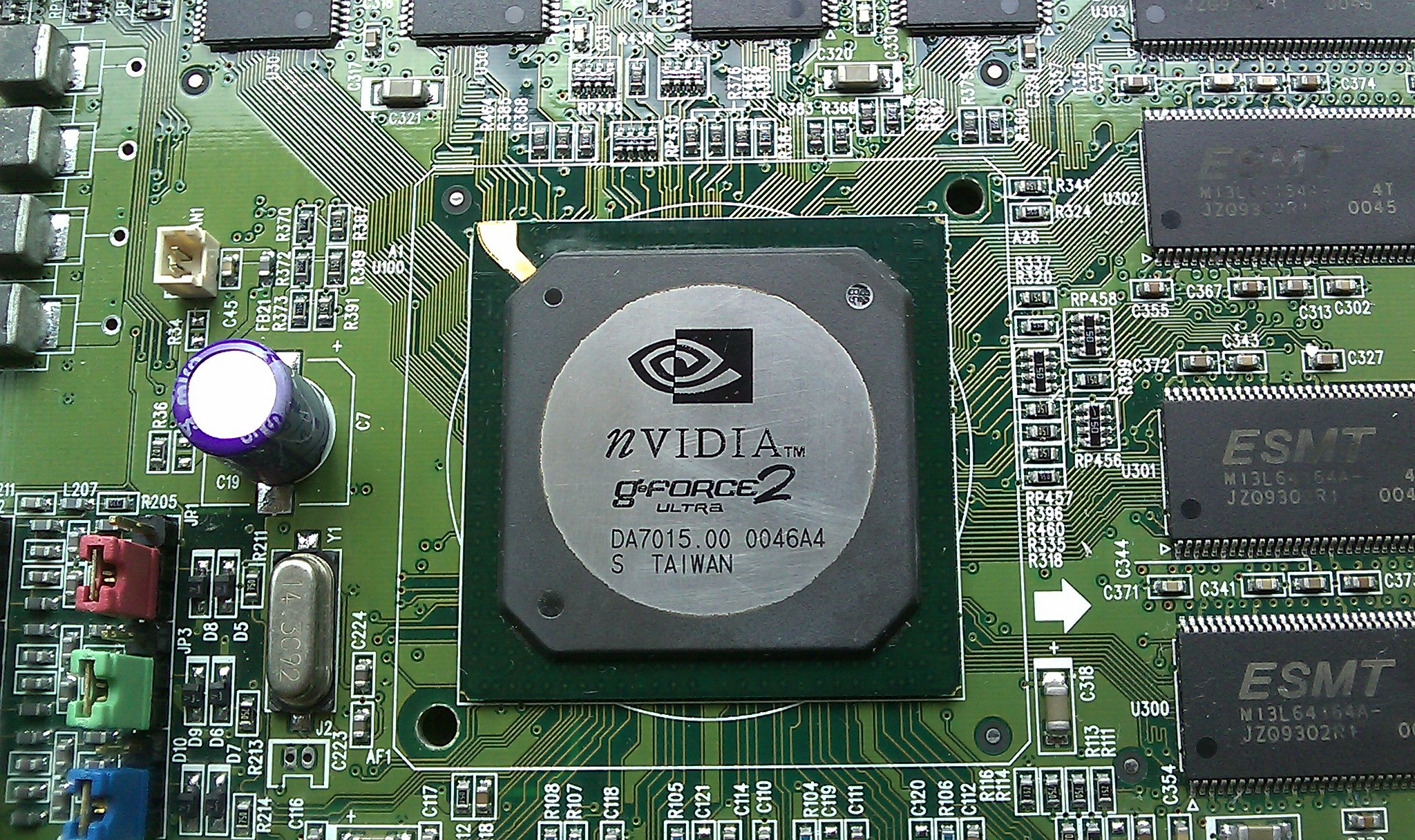
GeForce2 Ultra GPU

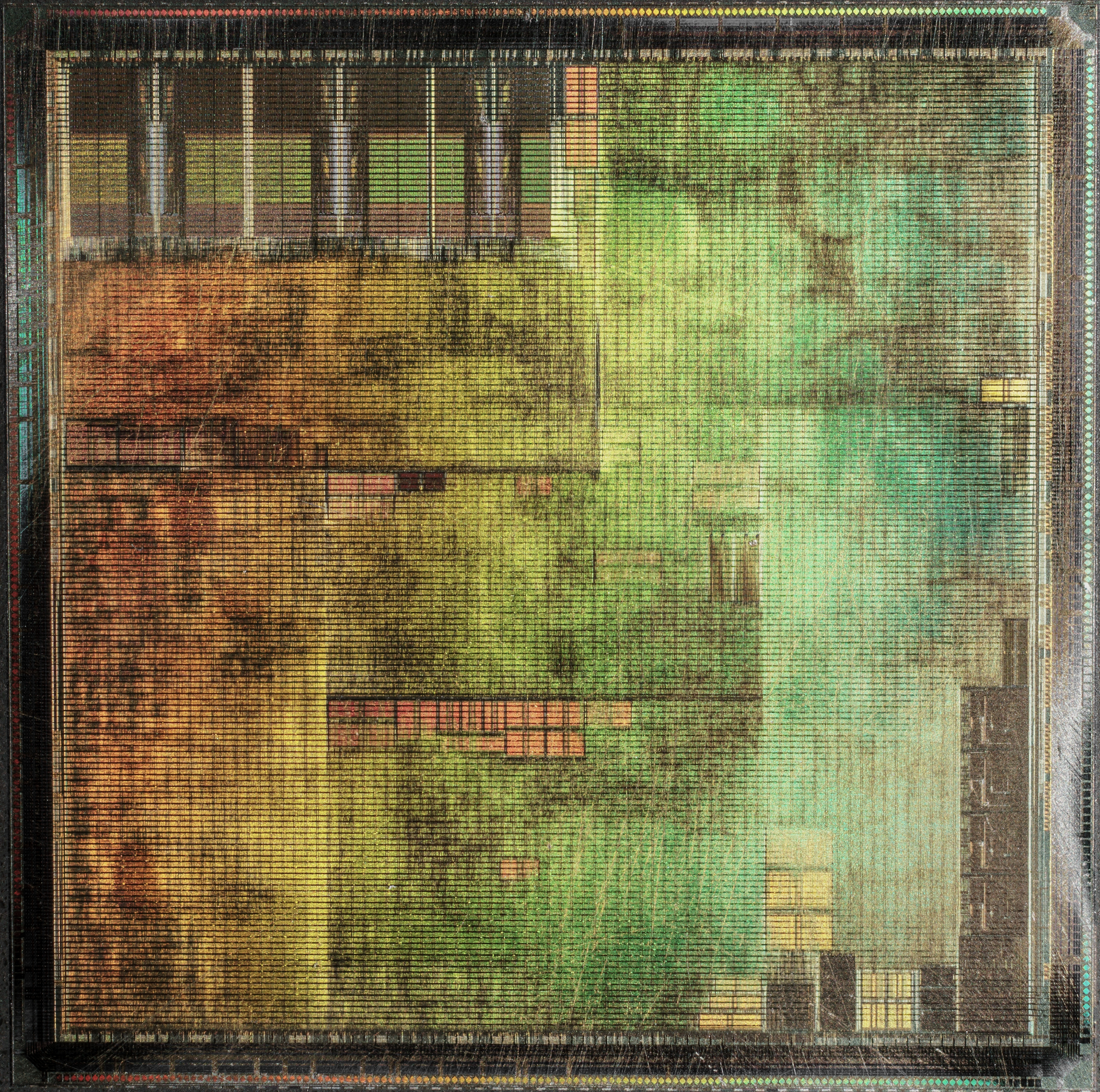
Die shot of a Geforce 2 GPU

The GeForce 2 architecture (NV15) is similar to the previous GeForce 256 line but with various improvements. Compared to the 220 nm GeForce 256, the GeForce 2 is built on a 180 nm manufacturing process, making the silicon more dense and allowing for more transistors and a higher clock speed. The most significant change for 3D acceleration is the addition of a second texture mapping unit to each of the four pixel pipelines. This doubles the texture fillrate per clock compared to the previous generation and is the reasoning behind the GeForce 2 GTS's naming suffix: GigaTexel Shader (GTS). The GeForce 2 also formally introduces the NSR (Nvidia Shading Rasterizer), a primitive type of programmable pixel pipeline that is somewhat similar to later pixel shaders. This functionality is also present in GeForce 256 but was unpublicized. Another hardware enhancement is an upgraded video processing pipeline, called HDVP (high definition video processor). HDVP supports motion video playback at HDTV-resolutions (MP@HL).

In 3D benchmarks and gaming applications, the GeForce 2 GTS outperforms its predecessor by up to 40%. In OpenGL games (such as Quake III), the card outperforms the ATI Radeon DDR and 3dfx Voodoo 5 5500 cards in both 16 bpp and 32 bpp display modes. However, in Direct3D games running 32 bpp, the Radeon DDR is sometimes able to take the lead.

The GeForce 2 (NV15) architecture is quite memory bandwidth constrained. The GPU wastes memory bandwidth and pixel fillrate due to unoptimized z-buffer usage, drawing of hidden surfaces, and a relatively inefficient RAM controller. The main competition for GeForce 2 GTS, the Radeon DDR (R100), has hardware functions (called HyperZ) that address these issues. Because of the inefficient nature of the GeForce 2 GPUs, they could not approach their theoretical performance potential and the Radeon, even with its significantly less powerful 3D architecture, offered strong competition. The later NV17 revision of the NV11 design used in the GeForce4 MX was more efficient.

=== Releases ===
The first models to arrive after the original GeForce 2 GTS was the GeForce 2 Ultra and GeForce2 MX, launched on September 7, 2000. On September 29, 2000, Nvidia started shipping graphics cards which had 16 and 32 MB of video memory size.

Architecturally identical to the GTS, the Ultra simply has higher core and memory clock rates. Meant to be a niche product, it was rumored that GeForce 2 Ultra was intended to prevent 3dfx taking the lead with their Voodoo 5 6000 that was ending up never released as 3dfx went bankrupt. The Ultra model actually outperforms the first GeForce 3 products in some cases, due to initial GeForce 3 cards having significantly lower fillrate. However, the Ultra loses its lead when anti-aliasing is enabled, because of the GeForce 3's new memory bandwidth/fillrate efficiency mechanisms; plus the GeForce 3 has a superior next-generation feature set with programmable vertex and pixel shaders for DirectX 8.0 games.

The GeForce 2 Pro, introduced shortly after the Ultra, was an alternative to the expensive top-line Ultra and is faster than the GTS.

In October 2001, the GeForce 2 Ti was positioned as a cheaper and less advanced alternative to the GeForce 3. Faster than the GTS and Pro but slower than the Ultra, the GeForce 2 Ti performed competitively against the Radeon 7500 (RV200), although the 7500 had the advantage of dual-display support. This mid-range GeForce 2 release was replaced by the GeForce4 MX series as the budget/performance choice in January 2002.

On their 2001 product web page, Nvidia initially placed the Ultra as a separate offering from the rest of the GeForce 2 lineup (GTS, Pro, Ti), however by late 2002 with the GeForce 2 considered a discontinued product line (being succeeded by the GeForce 4 MX), the Ultra was included along the GTS, Pro, and Ti in the GeForce 2 information page.

== GeForce 2 MX ==
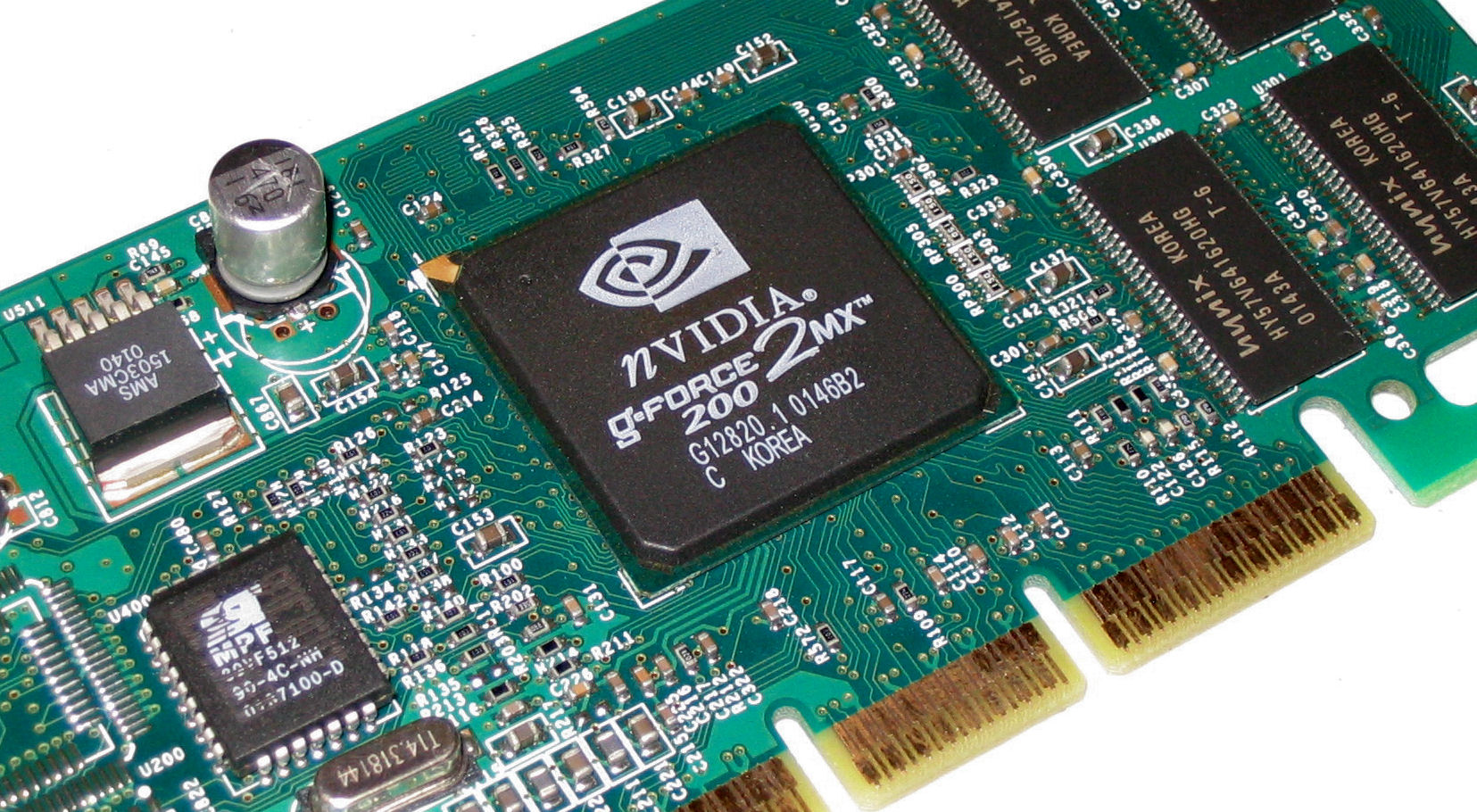
GeForce 2 MX200 AGP

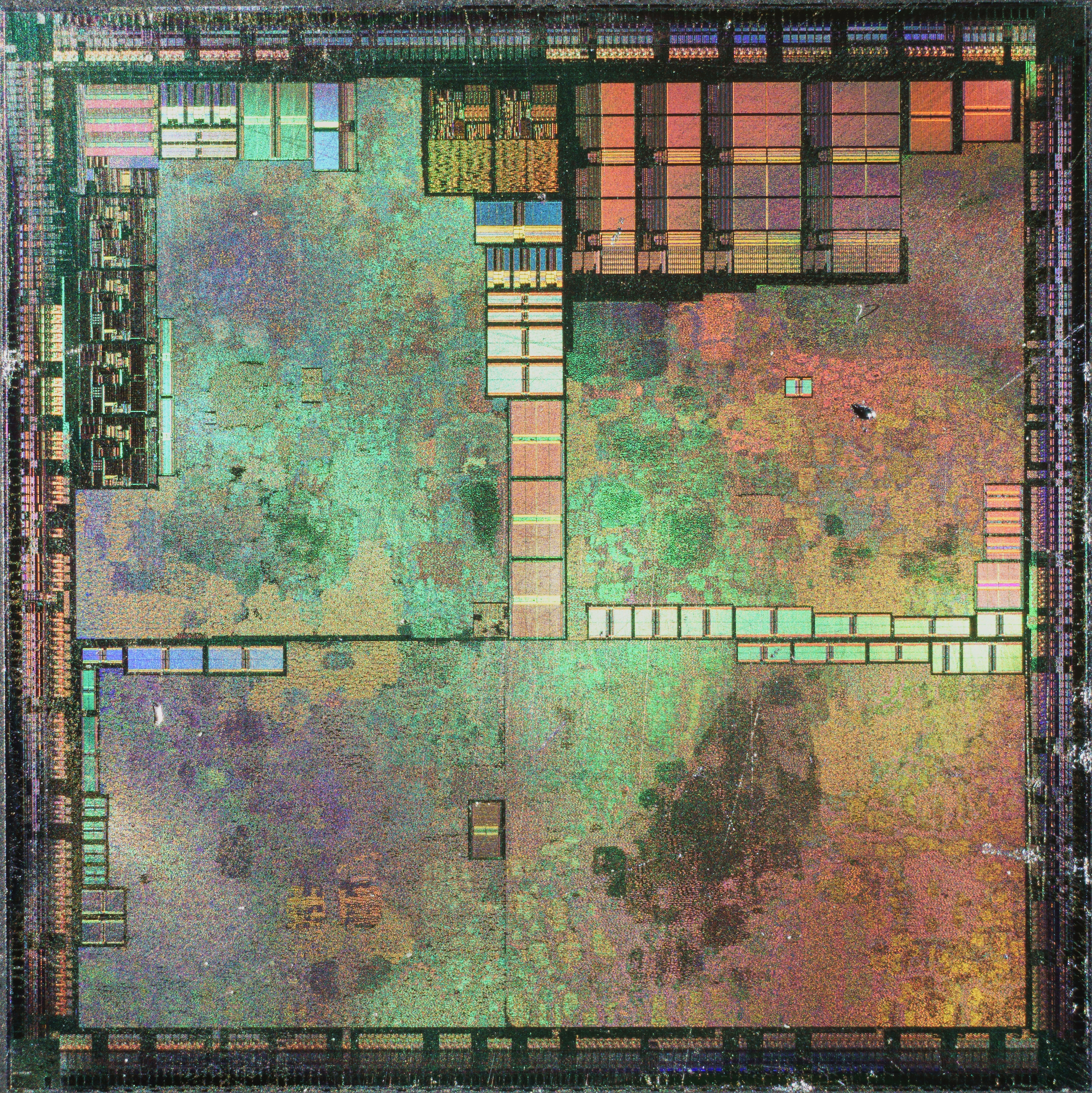
Die shot of the MX400 GPU

Since the previous GeForce 256 line shipped without a budget variant, the RIVA TNT2 series was left to fill the "low-end" role—albeit with a comparably obsolete feature set. In order to create a better low-end option, Nvidia created the GeForce 2 MX series (NV11), which offered a set of standard features similar to the regular GeForce 2 (NV15), limited only by categorical tier of lower performance. In order to reduce production costs, the GeForce 2 MX cards had two 3D pixel pipelines removed and a reduced available memory bandwidth. The cards utilized either SDR SDRAM or DDR SDRAM with memory bus widths ranging from 32 to 128 bits, allowing circuit board cost to be varied. The MX series also provided dual-display support, something not found in the GeForce 256 and GeForce 2. With performance approaching the GeForce 256 while also being much more economical to produce, the GeForce 2 MX was successful in the OEM and budget market.

The prime competitors in the OEM and budget segment were ATI's Radeon SDR (which with all other R100 chip-equipped cards, regardless of clock/memory speed and memory configuration, was later renamed collectively as Radeon 7200), Radeon VE (RV100) (later renamed Radeon 7000), and the 3dfx Voodoo4 4500. Sharing the same R100 GPU as the higher-end Radeon 32MB DDR (US$230), the Radeon SDR (US$150) was equipped with SDR SDRAM instead of DDR SDRAM found in its more expensive brethren although this did not bring down costs sufficiently to match the GeForce 2 MX. Released 3 months after the GeForce 2 MX, the Radeon SDR lacked multi-monitor support but exhibited faster 32-bit 3D rendering over the GeForce 2 MX. 3dfx's Voodoo4 4500 arrived too late, as well as being too expensive at US$150, but too slow to compete with Nvidia or ATI's offerings, and also lacking multi-monitor support. Next up, the Radeon VE's RV100 GPU was cut down considerably from the R100 to reduce production costs, so it did not offer hardware T&L, an emerging 3D rendering feature of the day that was the major attraction of Direct3D 7. Further, the Radeon VE featured only a single rendering pipeline, causing it to produce a substantially lower fillrate than the GeForce 2 MX. However the Radeon VE (US$100) had the advantage of somewhat better dual-monitor display software while matching the GeForce 2 MX on price.

Members of the series include GeForce 2 MX, MX400, MX200, and MX100. The GPU was also used as an integrated graphics processor in the nForce chipset line and as a mobile graphics chip for notebooks called GeForce 2 Go.

The NVIDIA GeForce2 MX 400 is often considered underwhelming because of its limited capabilities. With just 32 MB of SDR memory and an outdated architecture based on the Celsius design, it struggles to perform efficiently. Its low GPU clock speed of 200 MHz and support for only DirectX 7.0 further hamper its ability to handle modern games and applications. In the context of today's technology, the GeForce2 MX 400 is seen as outdated and insufficient for most graphic-intensive tasks.

== Successor ==
The successor to the GeForce 2 (non-MX) line is the GeForce 3. The non-MX GeForce 2 line was reduced in price and saw the addition of the GeForce 2 Ti, in order to offer a mid-range alternative to the high-end GeForce 3 product.

Later, both the GeForce 2 and GeForce 2 MX lines were replaced with the GeForce4 MX.

== Models ==
- All models support TwinView Dual-Display Architecture, Second Generation Transform and Lighting (T&L)
- GeForce2 MX models support Digital Vibrance Control (DVC)

Model	Launch	Code name	Fab (nm)	Transistors (million)	Die size (mm^{2})	Bus interface	Core clock (MHz)	Memory clock (MHz)	Core config (Note: Pixel pipelines: texture mapping units: render output units)	Fillrate				Memory				Performance (GFLOPS FP32)	TDP (Watts)
Model	Launch	Code name	Fab (nm)	Transistors (million)	Die size (mm^{2})	Bus interface	Core clock (MHz)	Memory clock (MHz)	Core config	MOperations/s	MPixels/s	MTexels/s	MVertices/s	Size (MB)	Bandwidth (GB/s)	Bus type	Bus width (bit)	Performance (GFLOPS FP32)	TDP (Watts)
GeForce2 MX IGP + nForce 220/420	June 4, 2001	NV1A (IGP) / NV11 (MX)	TSMC; 180 nm	20	64	FSB	175	133	2:4:2	350	350	700	0	Up to 32 system RAM	2.128; 4.256	DDR	64; 128	0.700	3
GeForce2 MX200	March 3, 2001	NV1A (IGP) / NV11 (MX)	TSMC; 180 nm	20	64	AGP 4x, PCI	175	166	2:4:2	350	350	700	0	32; 64	1.328	SDR	64	0.700	1
GeForce2 MX	June 28, 2000	NV1A (IGP) / NV11 (MX)	TSMC; 180 nm	20	64	AGP 4x, PCI	175	166	2:4:2	350	350	700	0	32; 64	2.656	SDR	128	0.700	4
GeForce2 MX400	March 3, 2001	NV1A (IGP) / NV11 (MX)	TSMC; 180 nm	20	64	AGP 4x, PCI	200	166,200 (SDR); 166 (DDR)	2:4:2	400	400	800	0	32; 64	1.328 3.200 2.656	SDR; DDR	64/128 (SDR); 64 (DDR)	0.800	5
GeForce2 GTS	April 26, 2000	NV15	TSMC; 180 nm	25	88	AGP 4x	200	166	4:8:4	800	800	1,600	0	32; 64	5.312	DDR	128	1.600	6
GeForce2 Pro	December 5, 2000	NV15	TSMC; 180 nm	25	88	AGP 4x	200	200	4:8:4	800	800	1,600	0	32; 64	6.4	DDR	128	1.600	?
GeForce2 Ti	October 1, 2001	NV15	TSMC; 150 nm	25	88	AGP 4x	250	200	4:8:4	1,000	1,000	2,000	0	32; 64	6.4	DDR	128	2.000	?
GeForce2 Ultra	August 14, 2000	NV15	TSMC; 180 nm	25	88	AGP 4x	250	230	4:8:4	1,000	1,000	2,000	0	64	7.36	DDR	128	2.000	?

=== GeForce2 Go mobile GPU series ===
- Mobile GPUs are either soldered to the mainboard or to some Mobile PCI Express Module (MXM).
- All models are manufactured with a 180 nm manufacturing process

Model	Launch	Code name	Bus interface	Core clock (MHz)	Memory clock (MHz)	Core config (Note: Pixel shaders: vertex shaders: texture mapping units: render output units)	Fillrate				Memory			
Model	Launch	Code name	Bus interface	Core clock (MHz)	Memory clock (MHz)	Core config	MOperations/s	MPixels/s	MTexels/s	MVertices/s	Size (MB)	Bandwidth (GB/s)	Bus type	Bus width (bit)
GeForce2 Go 100	February 6, 2001	NV11M	AGP 4x	125	332	2:0:4:2	250	250	500	0	8, 16	1.328	DDR	32
GeForce2 Go	November 11, 2000	NV11M	AGP 4x	143	166; 332	2:0:4:2	286	286	572	0	16, 32	2.656	SDR; DDR	128; 64
GeForce2 Go 200	February 6, 2001	NV11M	AGP 4x	143	332	2:0:4:2	286	286	572	0	16, 32	2.656	DDR	64

== Support ==
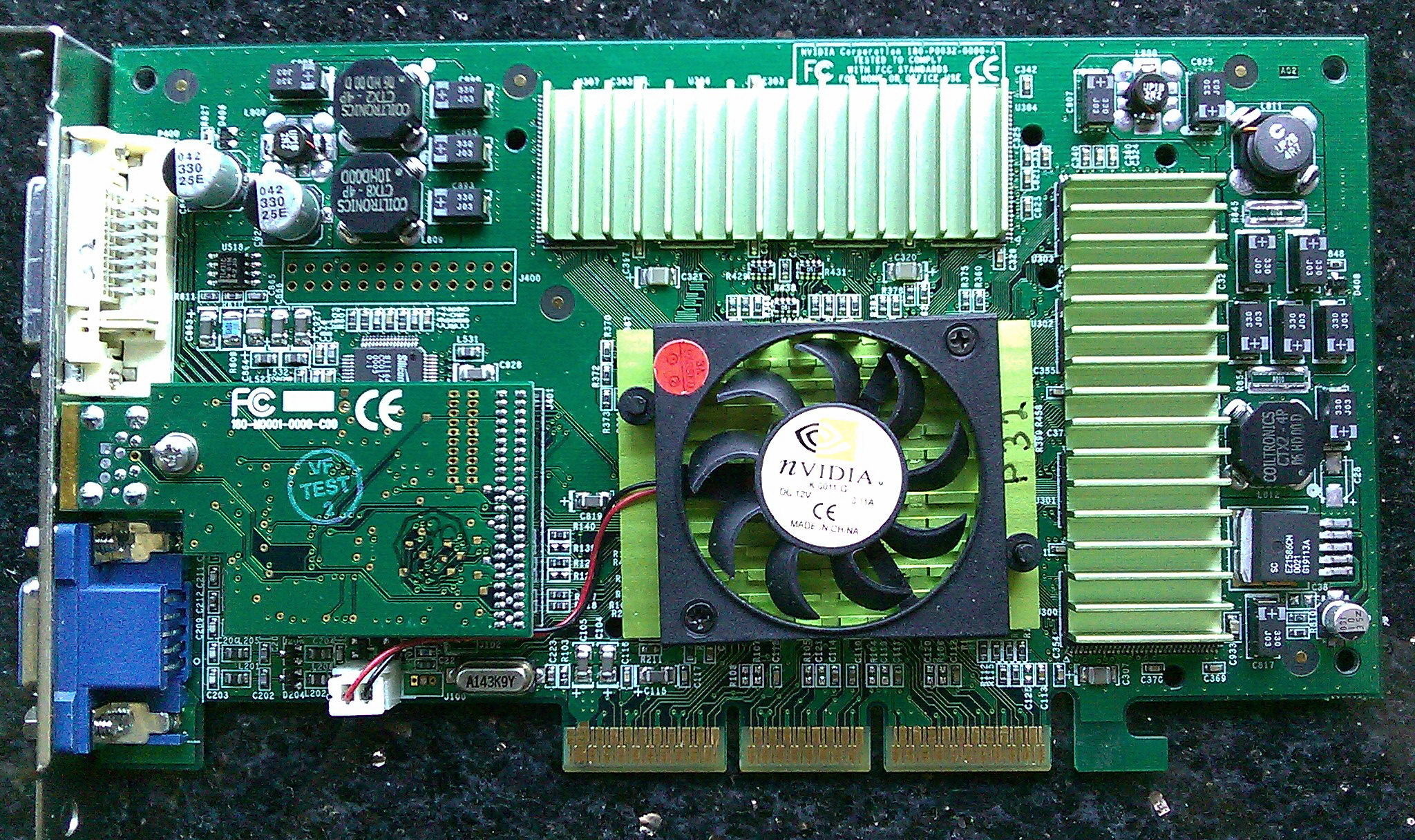
Nvidia GeForce2 Ultra

Nvidia has ceased driver support for GeForce 2 series, ending with GTS, Pro, Ti and Ultra models in 2005 and then with MX models in 2007.

=== Final drivers ===
GeForce 2 GTS, GeForce 2 Pro, GeForce 2 Ti and GeForce 2 Ultra:

- Windows 9x & Windows Me: 71.84 released on March 11, 2005; Download; Product Support List Windows 95/98/Me – 71.84.
- Windows 2000 & 32-bit Windows XP: 71.89 released on April 14, 2005; Download; Product Support List Windows XP/2000 - 71.84.
- Linux 32-bit: 71.86.15 released on August 17, 2011; Download

GeForce 2 MX & MX x00 Series:

- Windows 9x & Windows Me: 81.98 released on December 21, 2005; Download; Product Support List Windows 95/98/Me – 81.98.
  - Driver version 81.98 for Windows 9x/Me was the last driver version ever released by Nvidia for these systems. No new official releases were later made for these systems.
- Windows 2000, 32-bit Windows XP & Media Center Edition: 93.71 released on November 2, 2006; Download. (Products supported list also on this page)
  - For Windows 2000, 32-bit Windows XP & Media Center Edition also available beta driver 93.81 released on November 28, 2006; ForceWare Release 90 Version 93.81 - BETA.
  - Note: Despite claims in the documentation that 94.24 (released on May 17, 2006) supports the Geforce 2 MX series, it does not (94.24 actually supports only GeForce 6 and GeForce 7 series).
- Linux 32-bit: 96.43.23 released on September 14, 2012; Download

The drivers for Windows 2000/XP can also be installed on later versions of Windows such as Windows Vista and 7; however, they do not support desktop compositing or the Aero effects of these operating systems.

Windows 95/98/Me Driver Archive
Windows XP/2000 Driver Archive
Unix Driver Archive

== Competing chipsets ==
- 3dfx Voodoo 5
- ATI Radeon
- PowerVR Series 3 (Kyro)

== See also ==
- Graphics card
- Graphics processing unit
