= Maximum PC =

US magazine

- Cover of the March 2025 issue
- Editor-in-Chief: Guy Cocker
- Categories: Computing
- Frequency: Monthly
- Total circulation: 192,611 (2011)
- First issue: August 1996 (as boot); September 1998 (as Maximum PC)
- Final issue: April 2025
- Company: Future US
- Country: USA
- Based in: San Francisco
- Language: English
- Website: www.maximumpc.com
- ISSN: 1522-4279

Maximum PC, formerly known as boot, was an American magazine and website published by Future US. It focused on cutting-edge PC hardware, with an emphasis on product reviews, step-by-step tutorials, and in-depth technical briefs. Component coverage areas included CPUs, motherboards, core-logic chipsets, memory, videocards, mechanical hard drives, solid-state drives, optical drives, cases, component cooling, and anything else to do with recent tech news. Additional hardware coverage was directed at smartphones, tablet computers, cameras and other consumer electronic devices that interface with consumer PCs. Software coverage focused on games, anti-virus suites, content-editing programs, and other consumer-level applications.

Prior to September 1998, the magazine was called boot. boot and sister magazine MacAddict (now Mac|Life) launched in September 1996, when Future US shut down CD-ROM Today.

In March 2016, Future US announced that the Maximum PC website would be merged with PCGamer.com, appearing as the hardware section of the website from that point forward. The magazine was not affected by this change. Browsing to the http://MaximumPC.com/forum site no longer forwards to the forums and instead forwards to the Hardware section of PCGamer.com.

The final shipped print issue of Maximum PC was the April 2023 edition. New issues would continue being distributed through digital magazine formats.

In April 2025 it was announced that all publication of Maximum PC was ceasing and the April 2025 edition would be the final issue.

== Product reviews ==
Product ratings are rendered by editors on a scale of 1 to 10, with 10 being the best. The only product to receive an "11" rating was Half-Life 2 in January 2005, raising some objections from readers.

Outstanding products are also given a "Kick Ass" award. Exceptional products with a "9" rating and all products with a "10" rating receive this award.

Each review also includes a "Pros and Cons" section, providing a quick summary of the product. Shortly after the "Pros and Cons" first appeared, the editors began attaching humorous notations to their entries, many being puns or word play on the product itself or its function. For example, in a review of two monitors, one section is captioned LCD (pros) vs. LSD (cons). In another it is liquid crystal (pros) vs. crystal meth (cons). Other "Pros and Cons" comparisons have used B-58 vs. XB-70, Miley Cyrus vs. Billy Ray Cyrus, Delicious vs. Malicious, 3dfx Voodoo2 vs. 3dfx Voodoo3, Nvidia RIVA 128 vs. Nvidia RIVA TNT, AA Batteries vs. D Batteries, Fast Times at Ridgemont High vs. The Fast and the Furious, PCB vs. QVC, Counter-Strike vs. Hexen II, (Note: Counter-Strike was known for being used extensively in professional electronic sports tournaments and received numerous awards. including Online Game of the Year from Golden Joystick Awards in 2002 (The 2002 ceremony was hosted by Jonathan Ross of Friday Night with Jonathan Ross and Japanorama), while Hexen II was known for being commercial failures, with sales slightly above 30,000 units.) Matrix vs. Matrix Reloaded, 10012 vs. 90210, Mars vs. SARS, Super Troopers vs Starship Troopers, Comedy Central vs. Lifetime, QWERTY vs. DVDRAM, Jimi Hendrix vs. Jimmy Fallon, Sly and the Family Stone vs. Sly Stalone, Liberty Bell vs. Taco Bell, KVM, vs. Kia, Form Factor vs. Fear Factor, Nvidia vs. Chlamydia, RAID 1 vs. Police raid, Fat Tire Ale vs. Budweiser, College vs. The Real World, and Powered Sub vs. Togo's Sub.

== Notable features ==
- How To – detailed guides for things like creating a RAM disk or sharing a mouse and keyboard between two PCs.
- Ask the Doctor – advice for fixing computer-related problems.
- R&D – a look into the inner workings of commonly used hardware today.
- In the Lab – a behind-the-scenes look at Maximum PC testing. This section often includes humorous features sometimes involving "torturing" interns.
- Softy Awards – a yearly roundup of the staff's favorite new software (mostly utilities)
- Facebook poll – A monthly question about anything to do with tech. It includes comments from readers that are usually funny.
- Quickstart – a selection of brief news items bringing readers up to speed on notable events in PC technology.
- Comments – reader mail and questions
- Dream Machine – an annual attempt to build the best-performing PC on the market, using the best components and techniques available.
- Build It – a monthly walk-through of a new and interesting PC build, such as a computer submerged in mineral oil.
- Geek Quiz – an annual computer/technology quiz that claims it will have even the most hardcore geeks grinding their teeth.
- Gear of the Year – a review of the best PC parts for the current year.
- Tech Preview – an annual sneak-peek of upcoming hardware.

== Circulation ==
The magazine claims a 2010 circulation rate-base of 250,000.

Maximum PC also provides an archive of back-issues in PDF format free of charge on their website. This archive currently reaches back to the December, 2003 issue although nothing new has been published since the October 2014 issue.

All but a few of the Maximum PC issues published from October 1998 to December 2008 are available to view on various archival websites, such as Google Book Search.

== Staff ==
- Editor-in-Chief: Guy Cocker
- Staff Writers: Christian Guyton, Sam Lewis

Maximum PC also has many freelance contributors, including Ian Evenden, Kris Butterill, Chris Lloyd, Jarred Walton, John Knight, Alex Cox, Neil Mohr, Phil Iwanuik, Jeremy Laird and Matt Hanson.

== Maximum Tech ==
In September 2010, the Maximum PC editors started producing a quarterly magazine focusing on consumer tech. The basic idea of Maximum PC "Minimum BS" would be preserved in the magazine. The last issue of Maximum Tech was the Sept/Oct 2011 issue.

== Italian edition ==
An Italian edition of Maximum PC was launched in December 2004 by Future Media Italy, the Italian division of Future Publishing, and ceased publishing after only six issues.

== See also ==
- Custom PC – British magazine with same focus
