= Rendition, Inc. =

Computer graphics chipset company

- Type: Corporation
- Industry: PC Multimedia Products
- Founded: 1993
- Defunct: 1998
- Fate: Acquired by Micron Technology
- Headquarters: Mountain View, California
- Website: rendition.com at the Wayback Machine (archived 1998-01-23)

Rendition, Inc., was a maker of 3D computer graphics chipsets in the mid to late 1990s. They were known for products such as the Vérité 1000 and Vérité 2x00 and for being one of the first 3D chipset makers to directly work with Quake developer John Carmack to make a hardware-accelerated version of the game (vQuake). Rendition's major competitor at the time was 3Dfx. Their proprietary rendering APIs were Speedy3D (for DOS) and RRedline (for Windows).

== 3D Chipsets ==
=== Vérité V1000 ===
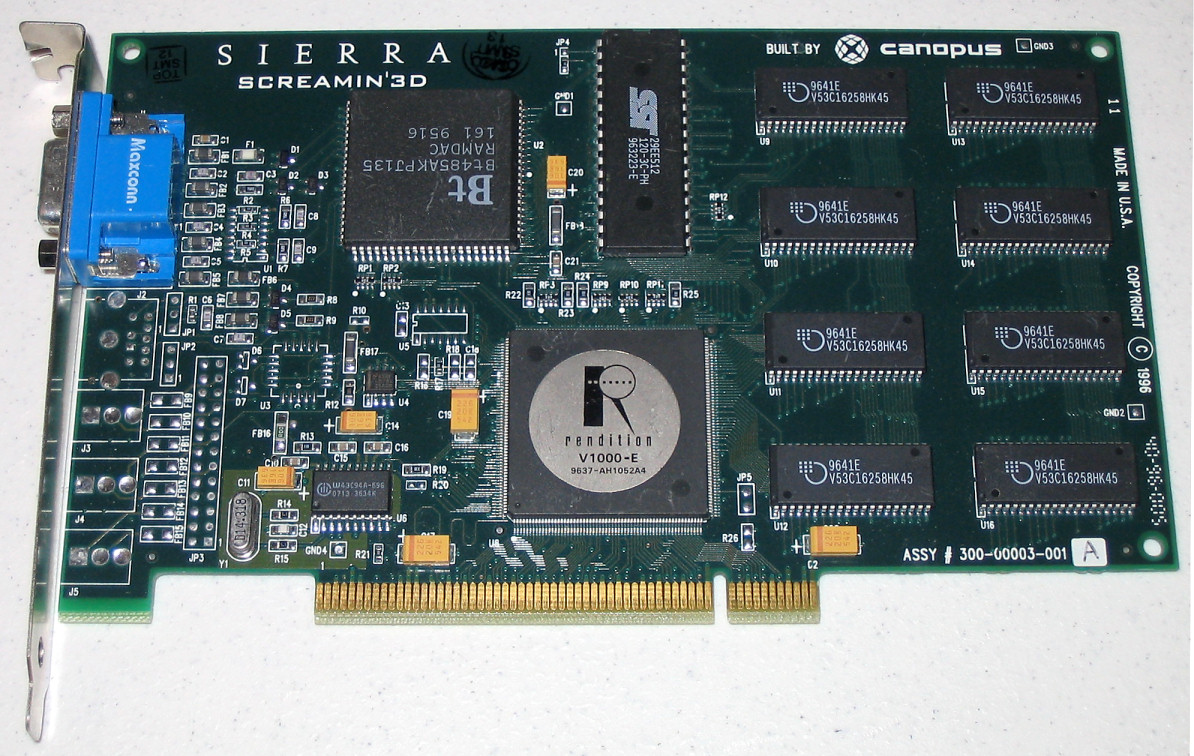
Sierra's Screamin' 3D. V1000-based

Released in 1996, Rendition's V1000 chipset was notable for its RISC-based architecture. The V1000 was the first PC graphics card to utilize a programmable core to render 3D graphics. V1000 was both faster and more advanced (in terms of features) than competitors such as the Matrox Millennium, ATI Rage, and S3 ViRGE. Only 3DFX's Voodoo Graphics was faster, but unlike the 3DFX Voodoo, the V1000 included 2D/VGA capability making it the only acceptably fast single-board solution for 3D games.

Vérité supported a local framebuffer of up to 4 MB EDO DRAM, on a 64-bit bus (for a theoretical 400 MB/s bandwidth). Aside from 3D games, Vérité contained an IBM VGA compatible display controller, and served as a traditional 2D/GUI accelerator for the Windows operating system.

Vérité's first claim to fame was being the only accelerator supported by Quake. Board partner Number Nine Visual Technology later canceled their Vérité products. In the book Masters of Doom, Carmack cited bad experiences with programming the Vérité as the reason for id's shift away from proprietary APIs toward the industry-standard OpenGL.

The V1000 was fairly popular when it was launched. At least four companies sold Vérité boards: the Creative Labs 3D Blaster PCI, the Sierra Screamin' 3D, the Canopus Total 3D, and the Intergraph Reactor (later renamed Intense 3D 100). A handful of software titles shipped with V1000 support. As the ATI Rage, S3 Virge, and Matrox Mystique delivered 3D graphics of questionable benefit, id Software's vQuake and Eidos's Tomb Raider were influential in fueling consumer interest in 3D rendering hardware. The Vérité (and Voodoo) ports added 16-bit color rendering, bilinear filtering, per-polygon MIP mapping, and edge anti-aliasing to the game's 3D visuals. Released in time for Christmas 1996, both vQuake and Tomb Raider demonstrated the V1000's 3D hardware to be both faster and better-looking than software rendering on even the most powerful host CPU.

An interesting piece of V1000's technology was its use of bus master DMA transfers for data transfer across the PCI bus. This allowed the board to transfer data much more efficiently than with the alternative FIFO mode of the bus. Unfortunately, the immaturity of the PCI bus at the time, and the limited use of bus mastering in general in systems of the day, caused DMA bugs to surface with Vérité. If a motherboard chipset wasn't capable of DMA, Vérité was forced to operate in FIFO mode and performance dropped dramatically. Additionally, on some motherboards, DMA support was incomplete or improperly implemented and speed was quite poor. Both of these issues combined to cause frequent problems for owners of the V1000. Rendition had a DMA test utility to benchmark a motherboard's support of DMA transfers. Some DOS games with Speedy3D Vérité support, such as IndyCar Racing II, offered a mode using DMA and a mode using FIFO, in order to bypass these issues.

The Vérité performed triangle setup in hardware. Rendition frequently touted its setup engine as an advantage against 3Dfx's Voodoo Graphics, because hardware setup reduced the host CPU's processing requirements for drawing complex 3D scenes. Unfortunately, the Vérité's 3D engine lacked the necessary fill rate to capitalize on this advantage; the V1000's pixel fill rate was, at best, roughly 25Mpixels/second (little more than half that of the Voodoo Graphics). Design limitations prevented V1000 from sustaining that level in many games (e.g. when the software uses z-buffering). While the Voodoo did become the accelerator of choice for high-budget 3D gamers, the V1000's triangle setup and integrated 2D/VGA core attracted many gamers looking to upgrade on a modest budget.

Outside of 3D games, V1000's (2D) performance was subpar in almost every way. On the extreme, in regular MCGA/VGA resolution or "Mode X", the V1000's performance was embarrassingly slow; older MS-DOS games (such as Doom) ran at near slideshow speeds, even on a top-of-the-line host CPU (Pentium 166 MHz). Rendition introduced "renutil", an MS-DOS utility, to address performance in MCGA graphics mode. The utility redirected MCGA (VGA-compatible) display mode setup to an equivalent VESA display mode, bypassing the Vérité's slow VGA core. The utility worked with all MCGA games, but was completely incompatible with games using "Mode X" VGA display mode, which could not be emulated using the VESA mode. Within Windows 95, the V1000 was passable, scoring neither top nor bottom in ZDnet's benchmark suite. In VESA VBE 2.0 display mode, Vérité's speed was outstanding, comparable to other top-rated cards of the era (such as the Matrox and ARK Logic PCI VGA chipsets.)

While Rendition had tried to craft the V1000 to support many application programming interfaces (APIs), these APIs were in their infancy at the time. For example, Microsoft's Direct3D standard was in rapid development with major changes occurring. V1000 was not optimized for this new Direct3D standard. However, this was more the fault of the API because Direct3D, at the time, lacked support for DMA transfers. The design of V1000, with its RISC core, was one of programmability. Because the GPU was not "hardwired" as ASICs are, the chip could potentially adapt to newer or differing standards than it was initially designed for. Performance limitations, however, inevitably dictated that the chip was not able to grow significantly. OpenGL support, for example, was very limited on V1000.

=== Vérité V2x00 ===
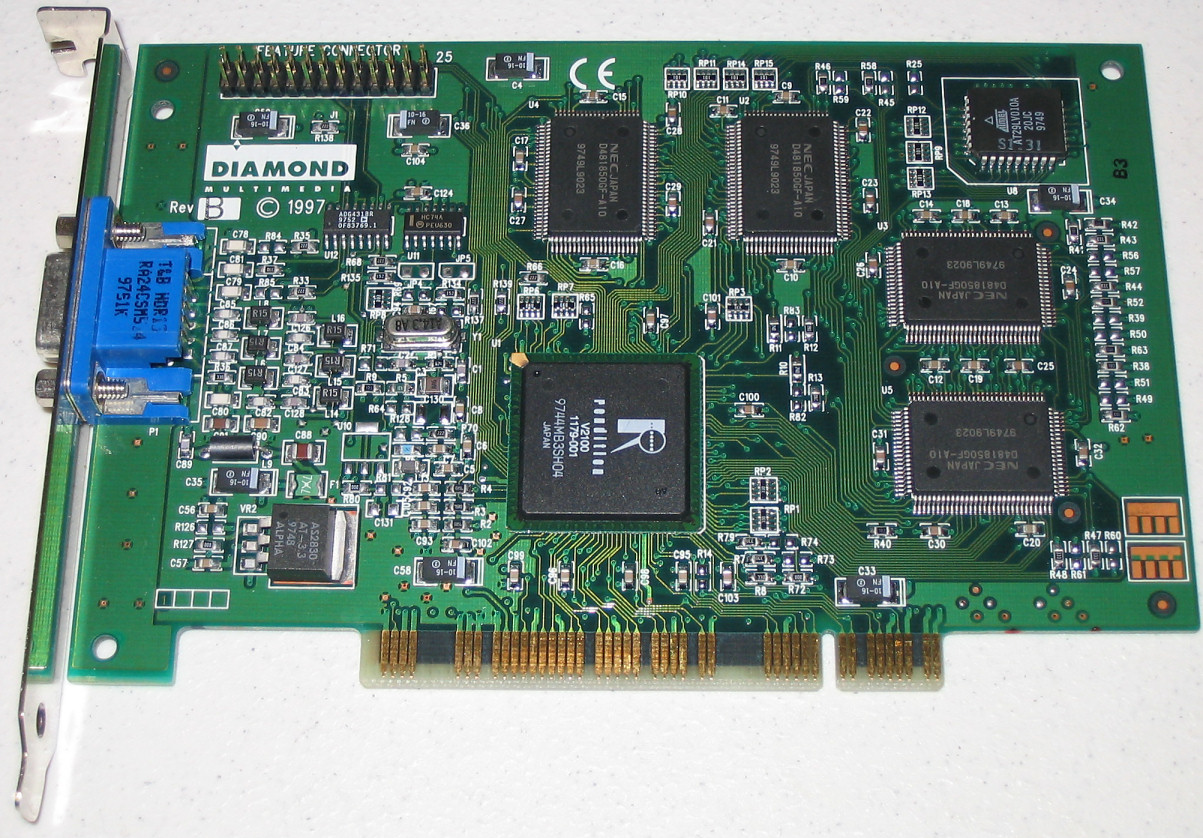
Diamond's Stealth II S220. V2100-based

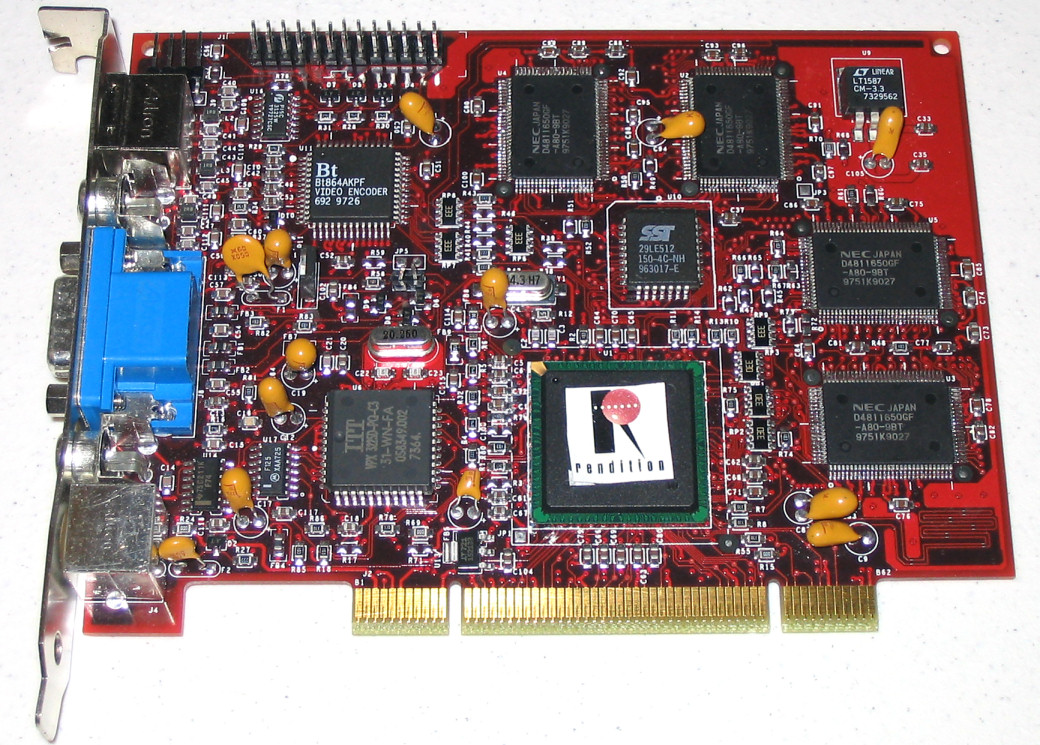
Rendition V2200 reference card (chip is unlabeled)

Rendition's 2nd generation architecture consisted of the Vérité V2100 and V2200. The chips were refined versions of the V1000 technology, most notably offering a single-cycle pixel computation (the V1000 took more than a single clock cycle to calculate each pixel). This boosted the chips' fill rate nearly twofold, and combined with faster memory and a slightly faster core clock rate, offered performance modestly ahead of 3Dfx Voodoo Graphics (the benchmark of the time).

These two chips were identical in every way other than clock speed, with the V2100 being used as a "value"-oriented chip. V2100 was typically clocked at 40-45 MHz, while V2200 was typically seen at 55-60 MHz. The V2100 only saw implementation on one board, the Diamond Multimedia Stealth II S220 PCI with 4 MB SGRAM, which was offered at $100 initially but quickly dropped to $50 due to limited demand. The Stealth II even received a BIOS update later in its life to up the clock speed of the V2100 to the same level as a V2200, as an attempt to boost interest in the card. The V2200 was seen on several cards, most notably the Hercules Thriller 3D offered in both AGP and PCI formats, with 4 MB or 8 MB SGRAM. V2200 offered a 55 megapixel/second fillrate with all of the features expected of a 3D accelerator at the time. Additions to the 2D and video acceleration improved performance and allowed hardware acceleration of DVD playback. The new chips were designed for Microsoft Windows 9x and NT 4.

Rendition and Hercules were at one point cooperating on a "Thriller Conspiracy" project which combined a Fujitsu FXG-1 "Pinolite" geometry processor with a V2200 core to create a graphics card with a full transform and lighting (T&L) engine years before Nvidia's GeForce 256 or ATI's Radeon. This board, designed to further reduce the load placed upon the system's CPU, never made it to market. Rumors spread that it was to be launched during Summer 1998, with a 9 MB board (1 MB for the Pinolite) costing $149 USD. Preliminary benchmarks showed very consistent performance regardless of the system's CPU speed. Unfortunately, by the time it would have launched, there were far more powerful accelerators available, such as NVIDIA's RIVA TNT and 3Dfx's Voodoo 2, that would have significantly overshadowed this board.

One of the most peculiar graphics boards ever made was part of the V2200 family. The Jazz Multimedia Outlaw 3D "Bonny & Clyde" combined both an AGP and a PCI connector on the same board. To use one or the other the user simply flipped the card and metal edge bracket over and plugged it in.

=== Vérité V3300 RRedline (unreleased) ===
The V3300 is Rendition's third generation 3D graphics chipset. It would have been manufactured on a 0.35 μm process at IBM and would have replaced the V2200 as Rendition's high-end chipset in early 1999. This chipset was never released. After several delays, in 1998 Rendition was purchased by Micron Technology and the project was cancelled.

- Dual Pixel Engine
  - dual-texturing for bilinear and trilinear filtering
  - specular highlighting (per vertex), Anti-aliasing
  - 3 million triangles/second triangle setup engine, 200 million pixels/s trilinear fillrate
- Dual independent 250 MHz RAMDAC CRT controllers
- iDCT transformations & motion compensation support (DVD playback acceleration)
- Compatible with 166 MHz SDRAM/SGRAM
- 128-bit bus architecture
- AGP 2X execute mode support

=== Vérité V4400E (unreleased) ===
With its acquisition by Micron in 1998, Rendition had hoped to take advantage of Micron's embedded DRAM technology. After the setbacks to the V3300 project, and its eventual cancellation due to delays, Rendition came back with promises for a V4400 chip in 2000. This new chip was purported to have 125 million transistors mostly used by 12 MB of embedded memory, a stunning level of complexity for the day. Although this embedded memory design was later used in Micron's AMD Athlon chipset codenamed "Mamba", the actual graphics chip never surfaced.

Previewed Micron "SuperChip2" motherboard chipset specifications:

- 180 nm process
- DDR SDRAM memory interface
- Rendition V4400 graphics core with 4 MB embedded DRAM. Can use system RAM as well.
- PCI interface, USB interface, Ultra ATA 66, AC'98 audio controller, IEEE 1394 interface

== Games with Rendition support ==
Rendition built a thorough list of supported games by encouraging developers large and small to make use of their free APIs. Rendition originally provided developers with Speedy3D, an MS-DOS-based API. Later, Rendition released a Windows version, branded RRedline. A free programming API was released to the public and the company hosted a programming competition called "Take it to the RRedline".

Games with native Rendition API support include Descent II, Grand Prix Legends, IndyCar Racing II, the Myth games, Sierra's NASCAR, Quake, Quake II, EF2000 V2.0, and Tomb Raider.

== Downfall ==
Rendition was one step behind other competitors coming to market at a pivotal time in the 3D PC graphics engines battle. The NVIDIA RIVA 128 came to market in late 1997. The V2100 saw first silicon in early 1997, but was late to sample due to a digital cell library bug necessitating a respin.

Rendition used libraries developed by SiArch (licensed through Synopsys at that time) for their digital logic synthesis, which is done by means of sophisticated software auto generating and simulating the actual chip manufacturing process. This software avoids the expensive and labor intensive manufacturing of faulty hardware. Chips are quality tested in simulation before manufacture, or "spiced", because faults are incredibly difficult to detect in microchips with modern trace widths, even with highly accurate instrumentation.

A critical section of circuitry happened to synthesize into a 3 input nor-gate driving a scanned flip-flop. The scan-flop had three passive transmission gate muxes driven by the three n-type transistors in the NOR3, all in series. The result of this was excessive resistance with a weak bus-hold cell, which ate into the allowable noise margin and violated the static discipline in good digital logic design. This combination of faults was not found in the software test environment by SiArch before manufacture.

These faults manifested as an intermittent bug that was seen in the lab on real silicon but not in high level functional or even RTL or gate-level simulations. The root cause was only determined after months of investigation, simulations, and test case development in the lab, which narrowed the problem to a very confined space. At that point, the chip was run live under a scanning electron microscope using the oscilloscope probe mode to find the problem net between the NOR3 gate and the scan-flop. The combination was then spiced and confirmed to be the culprit.

Two full quarters were lost due to this bug. When it was released, V2x00 shipped with fully conformant OpenGL and D3D drivers, but it arrived late to the market.

The company was eventually purchased by Micron, who kept the development team intact as a source of embedded graphics solutions for their own line of motherboards. Rendition's engineers were initially excited by the prospect of utilizing Micron's embedded DRAM technology for a high-end graphics processor, but such a product never surfaced commercially.

Micron resurrected the Rendition brand name as a value line of RAM by Micron Technology's consumer memory division, Crucial Technology. Micron has since re-branded the Rendition line as SpecTek Select, aimed at OEMs and resellers

== Competing chipsets ==
=== V1000 era ===
- 3D Labs Permedia
- 3Dfx Voodoo Graphics
- ATI 3D Rage and Rage II
- Matrox Mystique
- Number Nine Imagine 128 Series 2
- NVIDIA NV1
- NEC-VideoLogic PowerVR Series 1 (PCX1)
- NEC PC-FXGA
- S3 ViRGE

=== V2x00 era ===
- 3D Labs Permedia 2
- 3Dfx Voodoo2 and Voodoo Rush
- ATI 3D Rage Pro
- Matrox Mystique 220; Matrox Millennium II and Matrox m3D
- Number Nine Ticket 2 Ride
- NVIDIA RIVA 128
- PowerVR Series 2 (PCX2)
- S3 ViRGE DX/GX/GX2 and Trio3D
- SiS 6326
