= NV1 =

1995 computer graphics card

Nvidia NV1 / STG2000
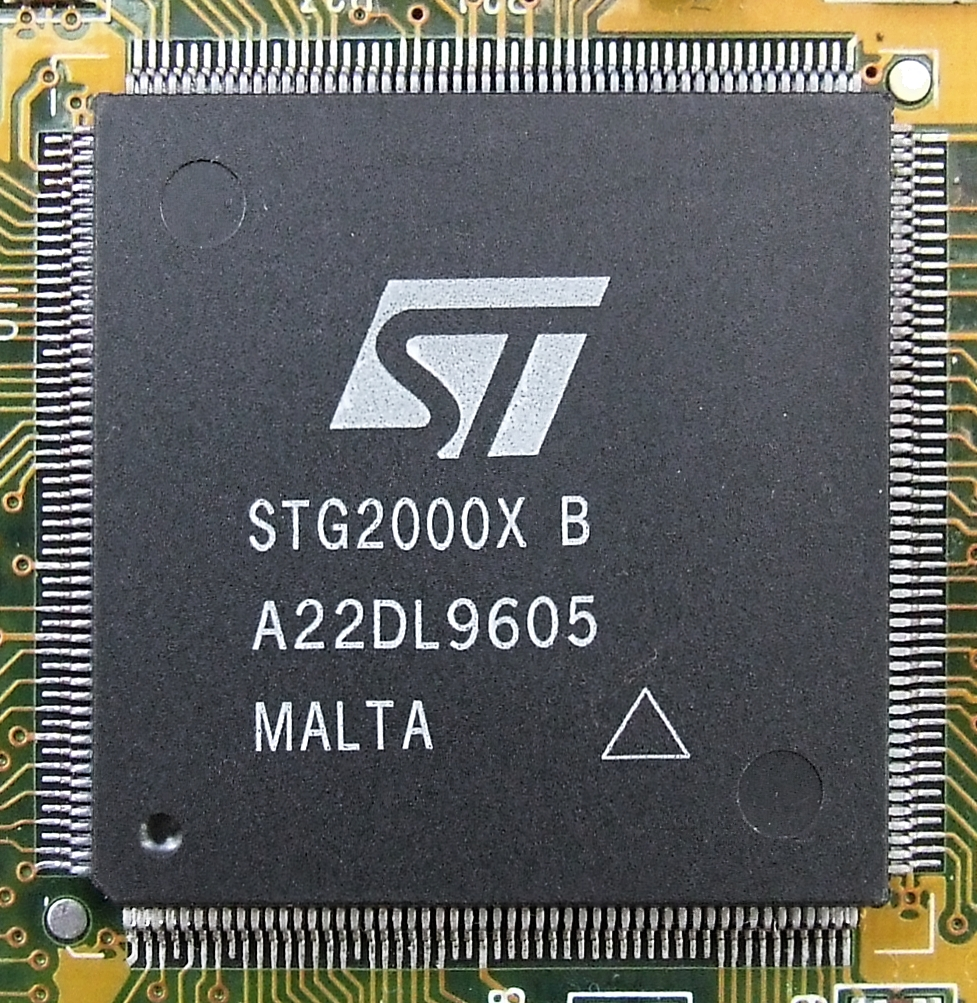
- NV1 chip manufactured by SGS-Thomson under the model name STG2000
- Release date: May 22, 1995
- Manufactured by: SGS-Thomson Microelectronics
- Designed by: Nvidia
- Marketed by: Diamond Multimedia
- Codename: NV1
- Fabrication process: 500 nm

History
- Successor: RIVA 128

Support status
- Unsupported

The NV1 was Nvidia's first graphics accelerator, introduced in May 1995 and released later that year as a multimedia PCI card. Manufactured by SGS-Thomson Microelectronics, sometimes under the model name STG2000, the chip was sold in retail by Diamond as the Diamond Edge 3D card. The NV1 stood out for its use of quadratic texture mapping, a departure from the triangular primitives favored by competitors. The use of quadratics made it possible to port games from the Sega Saturn; however, after the NV1 was introduced, Microsoft announced that DirectX would exclusively support triangle primitives. As a result, the NV1 failed to gain traction in the market.

In addition to its 2D/3D graphics core and Video RAM or FPM DRAM memory, the NV1 card also integrated the functionality of a 32-channel playback-only sound card, and had a joystick port, along with ports for two Sega Saturn controllers. As such, it was marketed as a "multimedia card" that was a replacement for both a graphics card and a Sound Blaster-compatible audio card in IBM PC compatible systems. However, this made it more expensive, and with many computer owners owning a sound card, the all-in-one design further hurt its market appeal.

The NV2 was a follow-up chip developed for Sega's Dreamcast, but was ultimately abandoned. Nvidia shifted focus with its next product, the RIVA 128, which adopted triangle primitives and dropped the audio functionality. This alignment with Direct3D and a more streamlined design made the RIVA 128 a success.

== History ==
Several Sega Saturn games saw NV1-compatible conversions on the PC such as Panzer Dragoon and Virtua Fighter Remix. However, the NV1 struggled in a market place full of several competing proprietary standards, and was marginalized by emerging triangle polygon-based 2D/3D accelerators such as the low-cost S3 Graphics ViRGE, Matrox Mystique, ATI Rage, and Rendition Vérité V1000 among other early entrants. Commercial performance was poor: Game Developer reported that Diamond Multimedia wrote off $5 million in excess Edge 3D inventory in 1996, and Nvidia later said it stopped selling the NV1 in the first quarter of 1996.

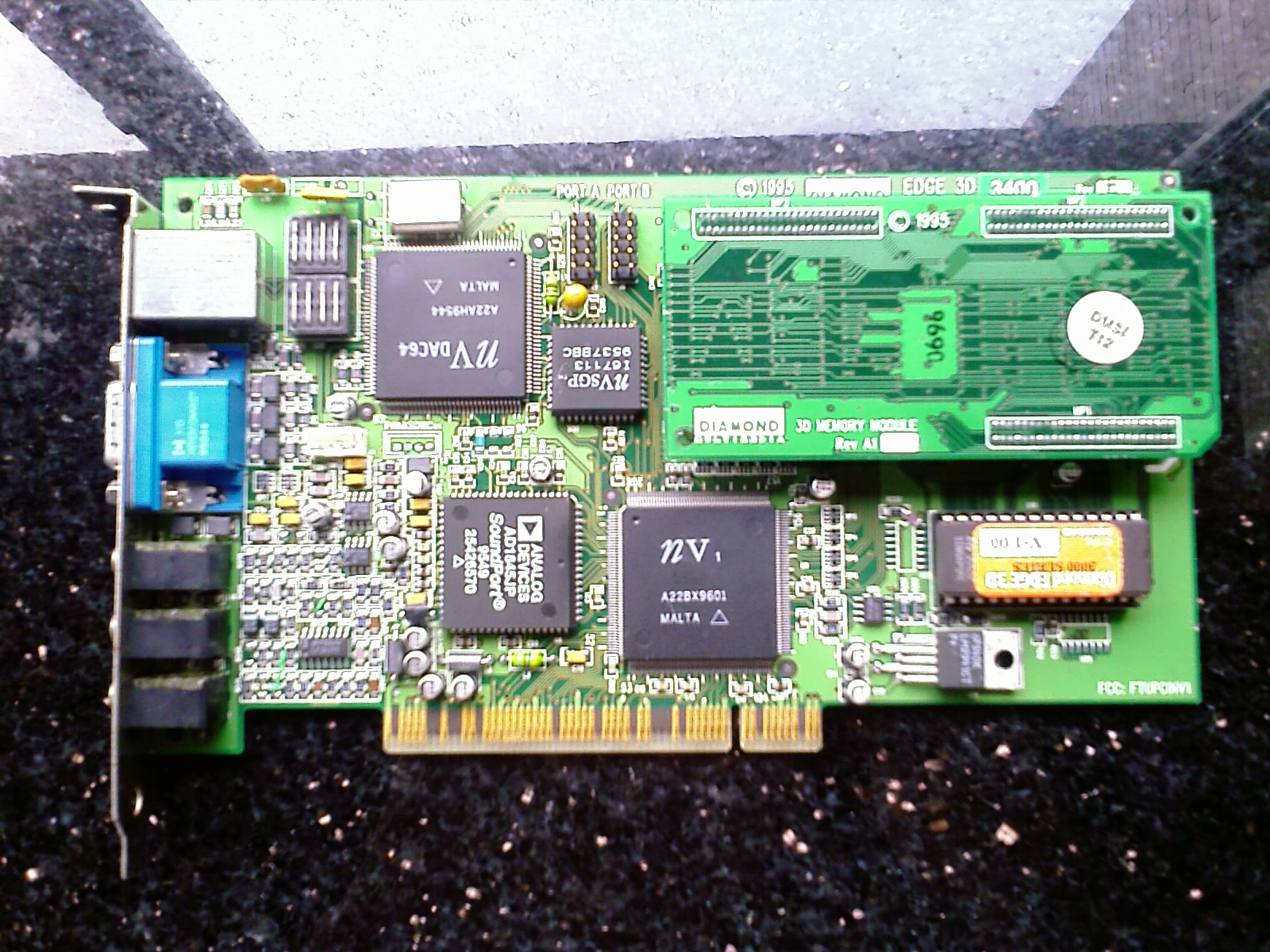
Diamond EDGE 3D 3400

NV1's biggest initial problem was its cost and overall quality. Although it offered credible 3D performance, its use of quadratic surfaces was not popular, and was quite different than typical polygon rendering. The audio portion of the card received merely acceptable reviews, with the General MIDI receiving mixed responses at best (a critical component at the time due to the superior sound quality produced by competing products). The Sega Saturn was a market failure compared to Sony's PlayStation or Sega's earlier Sega Genesis, and so the unique and somewhat limiting support of these gamepads was of limited benefit. Nvidia, by integrating all of these usually separate components, raised their costs considerably above what they would have been if the card had been designed solely for 3D acceleration.

During the NV1's release timeframe, the transition from VLB/ISA (486s) to PCI (Pentiums and late model 486 boards) was taking place, and games often used MIDI for music because PCs were still generally incapable of large-scale digital audio playback due to storage and processing power limitations. Reaching for the best music and sound quality, and flexibility with MS-DOS audio standards, often required 2 sound cards be used, or a sound card with a MIDI daughtercard connector. Additionally, NV1's 2D speed and quality were not competitive with many of the high-end systems available at the time, especially the critical-for-games DOS graphics speed. Many customers were simply not interested in replacing their often-elaborate system setups with an expensive all-in-one board and so the heavy integration of NV1 hurt sales simply through inconvenience.

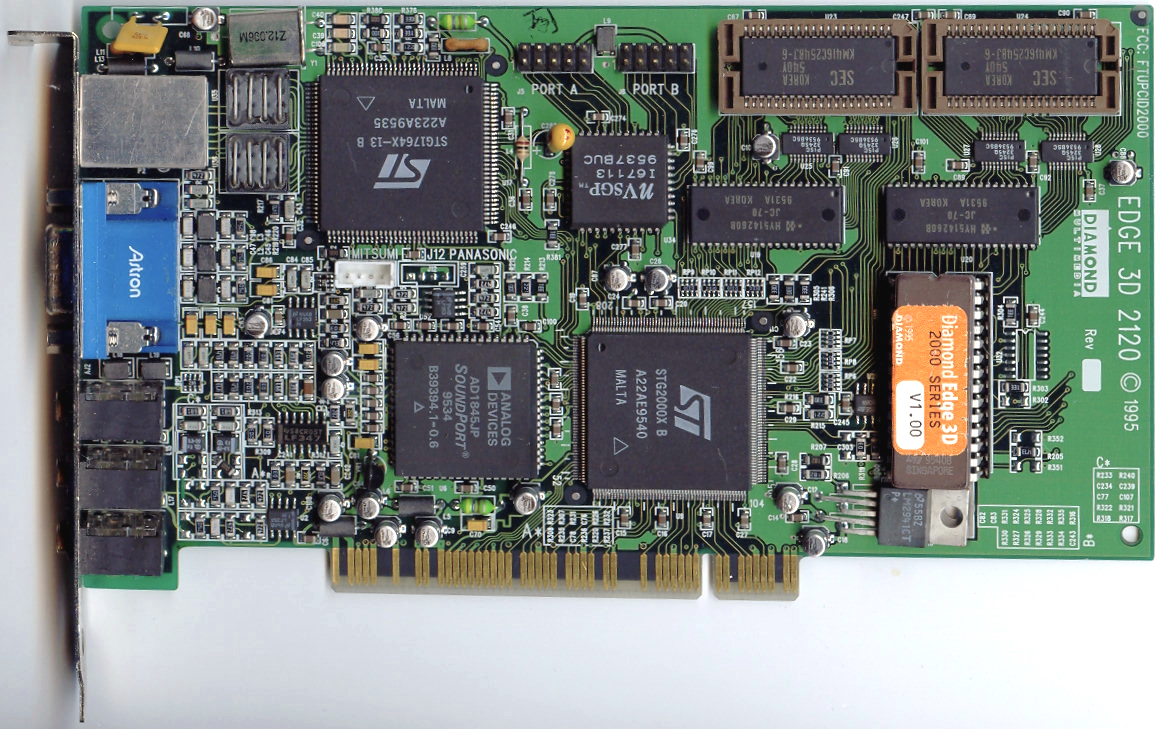
Diamond EDGE 3D 2120

Market interest in the product quickly ended when Microsoft announced the DirectX specifications, based upon triangle polygon rendering. This release by Microsoft of a major industry-backed API that was generally incompatible with NV1 ended Nvidia's hopes of market leadership immediately. While demos of quadratic rendered round spheres looked good, experience had proved working with quadratic texture maps was extremely difficult. Even calculating simple routines was problematic. Nvidia did manage to put together limited Direct3D support, but it was slow and buggy (software-based), and no match for the native triangle polygon hardware on the market.

Subsequent NV1 quadratic-related development continued internally as the NV2.

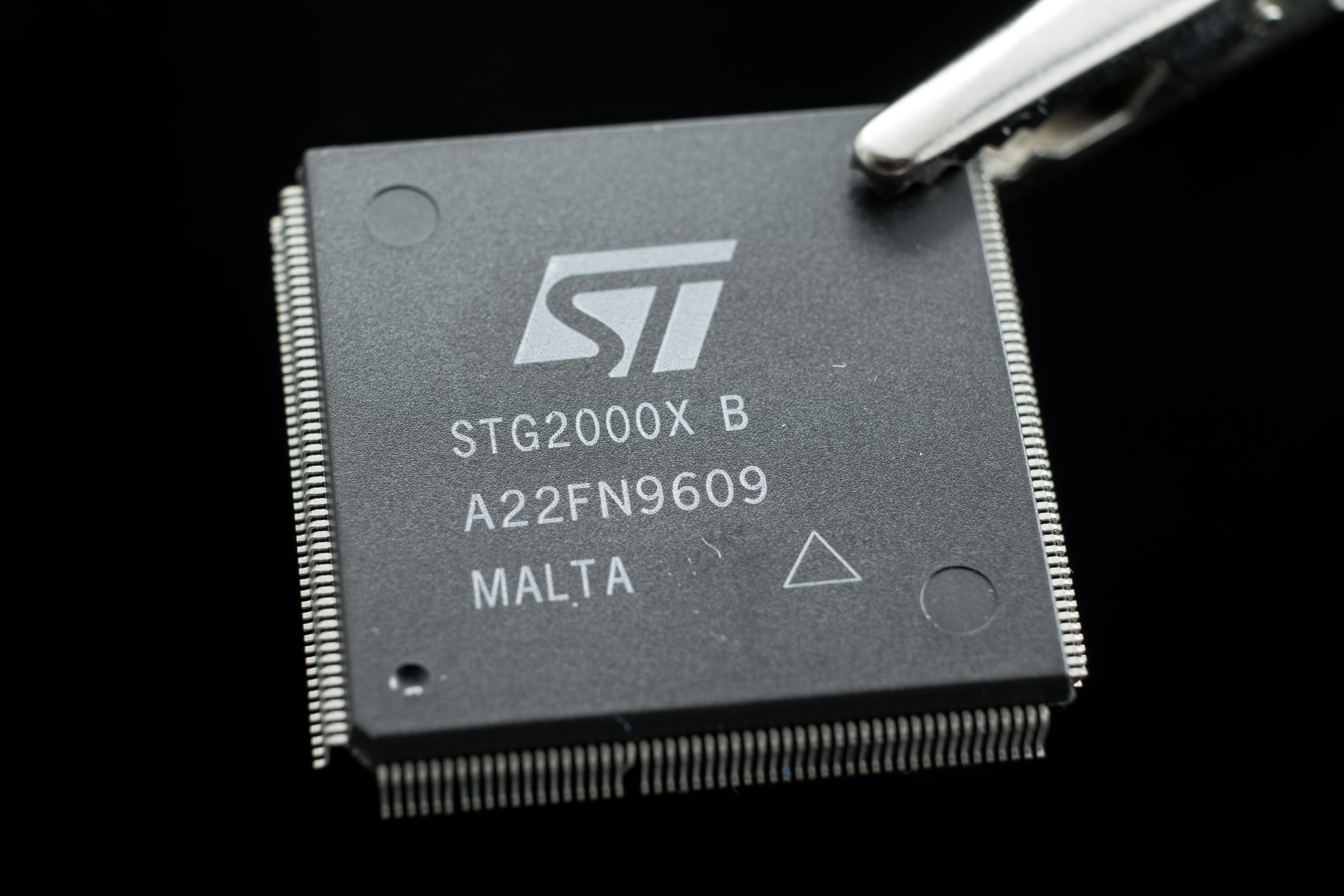
The NV1

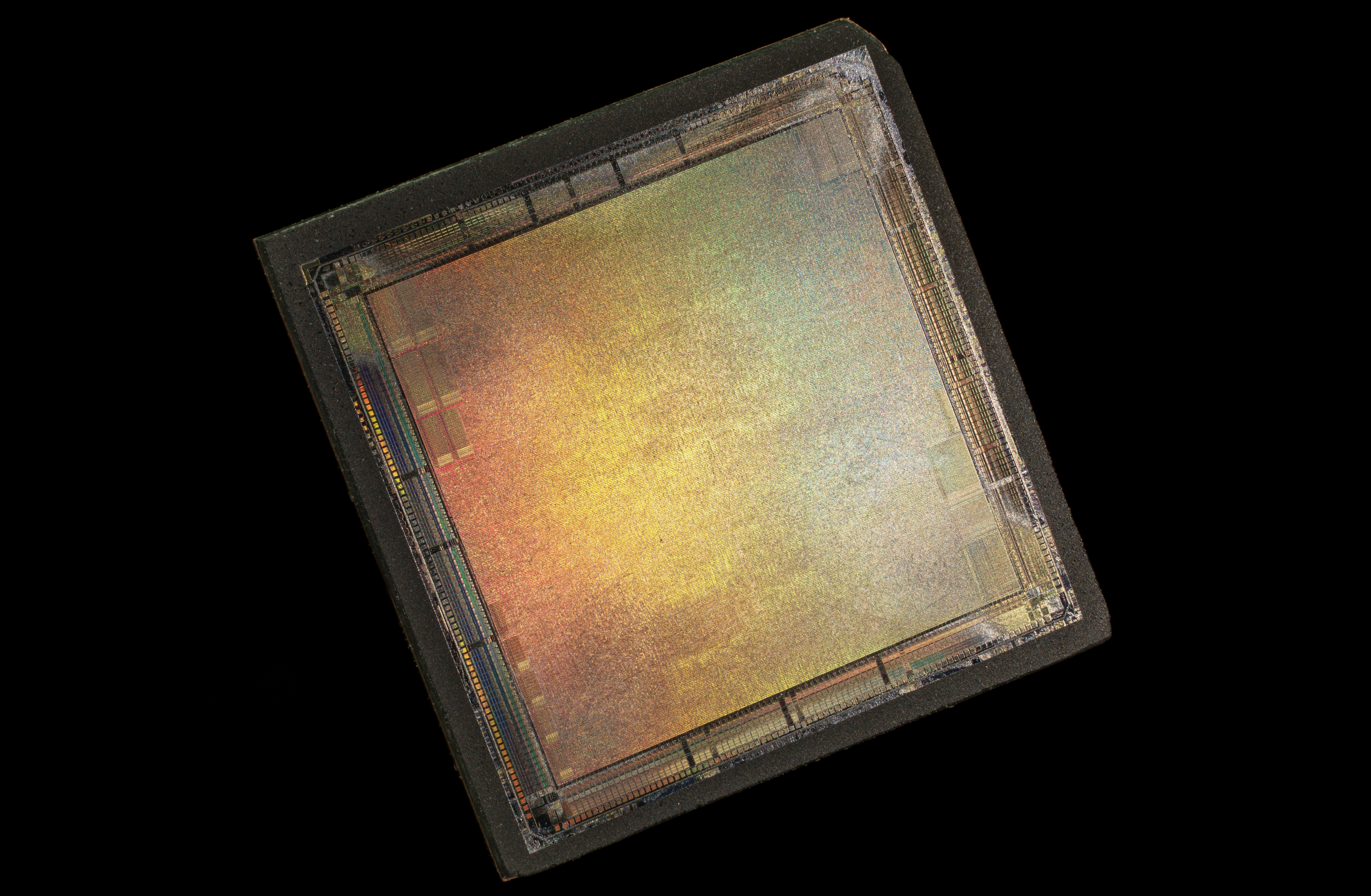
Die shot of the NV1

== NV2 ==
NV2 was to be Nvidia's second PC 3D accelerator graphics chip, but it was cancelled before completion. It was planned to succeed the NV1.

NV2 built upon its predecessor's unusual quadratic 3D-rendering architecture. It was initially considered for use in Sega's Dreamcast console, due to the relationship cultivated between Nvidia and Sega over the porting of Sega arcade and Saturn console titles over to the PC platform, where the similarity in NV1's and Saturn's 3D-rendering architecture aided in the porting process. (The NV1 graphics cards had 2 Sega Saturn gamepad ports integrated so that Saturn titles could be easily ported over to the NV1 cards and have an equal gameplay experience.) However, experience with both Saturn and NV1's 3D-rendering architecture in the Saturn ultimately led the company to abandon quadratic 3D-rendering architecture altogether, in favor of a more traditional architecture that operated on triangle primitives.

Nvidia's strong desire to stick with their maturing quadratic forward texture mapping technology was a great cause of friction between Sega and Nvidia. One part of the equation was undoubtedly that Sega's PC games division. A quadratic 3D game engine would be very difficult to port over to just about any other contemporary 3D graphics hardware, all of which used triangle primitives and inverse-texture mapping. More importantly, although consumer 3D hardware was still in its infancy, there was general consensus within the industry that triangle primitives with inverse-texture mapping would be standard going forward. Sega ultimately selected NEC/VideoLogic's PowerVR2 to power the 3D graphics in the Dreamcast.

Because the demand was not there from Sega, and the PC market had drastically changed direction away from QTM due to the popularity of the triangle polygon-based OpenGL and DirectX, NVIDIA abandoned further development of the NV2 and started on a new architecture, a.k.a. "NV3" or RIVA 128.

== Supported games ==
- Battle Arena Toshinden
- Daytona USA (Japanese releases)
- Descent: Destination Saturn
- NASCAR Racing
- Panzer Dragoon
- Sonic X-treme (cancelled)
- Twisted Metal (Japanese releases)
- Virtua Fighter Remix
- Virtua Cop

== Chipset table ==
Model		STG-2000
Launch		May 22, 1995
Code name		NV1
Fab (nm)		SGS 500 nm
Transistors (million)		1
Die size (mm^{2})		90
Bus interface		PCI
Core clock (MHz)		12, 75
Memory clock (MHz)		50, 60
Core config (Note: Pixel pipelines: texture mapping units: render output units)		1:1:1
Fillrate	MOperations/s	12
Fillrate	MPixels/s	12
Fillrate	MTexels/s	12
Fillrate	MVertices/s	0
Memory	Size (MB)	1, 2, 4
Memory	Bandwidth (GB/s)	0.4, 0.48
Memory	Bus type	FPM, EDO, VRAM
Memory	Bus width (bit)	64
TDP (Watts)		?
Latest API support	Direct3D	1.0
Latest API support	OpenGL	n/a
