= Voodoo3 =

Series of gaming video cards

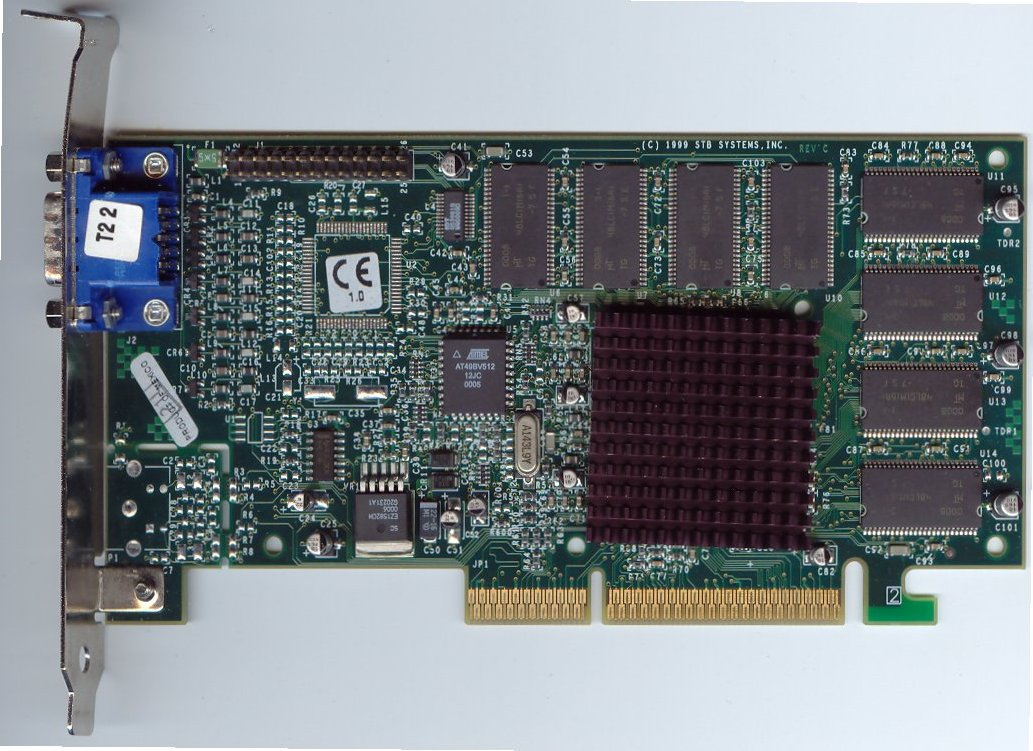
- 3dfx Voodoo3 2000 AGP
- Release date: March 1999; 27 years ago
- Codename: Avenger

Cards
- Entry-level: Velocity 100, Velocity 200
- Mid-range: Voodoo3 1000, Voodoo3 2000
- High-end: Voodoo3 3000, OEM Voodoo3 3500
- Enthusiast: Voodoo3 3500 TV
- Direct3D: Direct3D 6.0

History
- Predecessor: Voodoo2
- Successor: Voodoo 5

Support status
- Unsupported

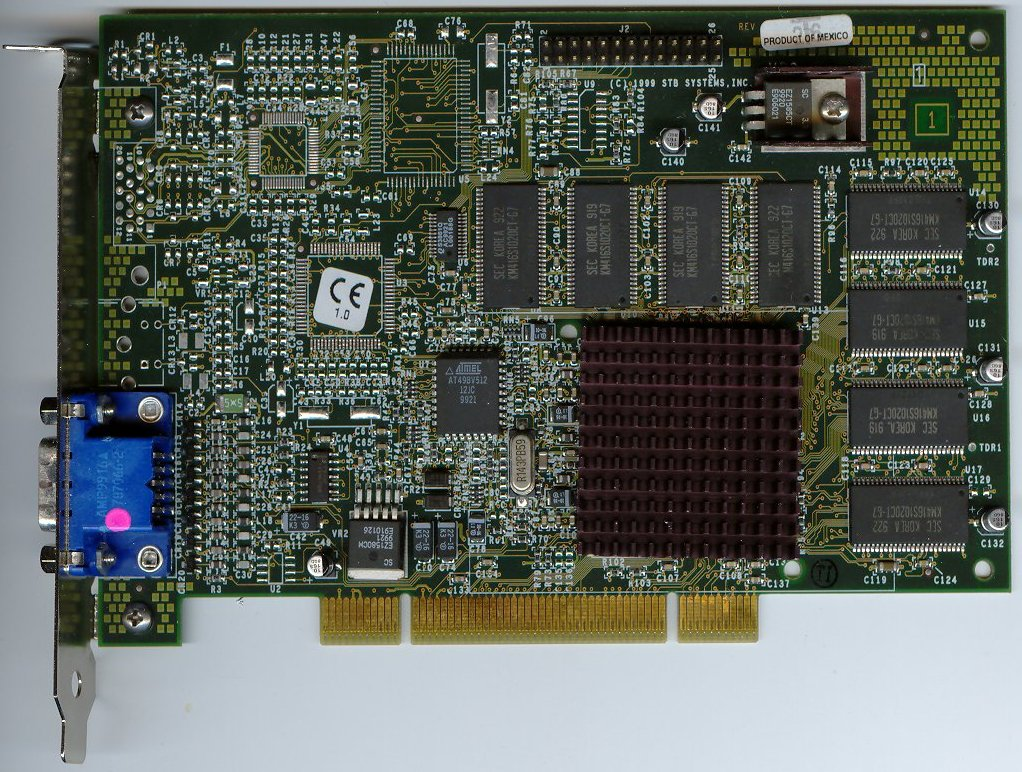
3dfx Voodoo3 2000 PCI

3dfx Voodoo3 3000 AGP

Voodoo3 was a series of computer gaming video cards manufactured and designed by 3dfx Interactive. It was the successor to the company's high-end Voodoo2 line and was based heavily upon the older Voodoo Banshee product. Voodoo3 was announced at COMDEX '98 and arrived on store shelves in early 1999. The Voodoo3 line was the first product manufactured by the combined STB Systems and 3dfx.

== History ==
The 'Avenger' graphics core was originally conceived immediately after Banshee. Due to mis-management by 3dfx, this caused the next-generation 'Rampage' project to suffer delays which would prove to be fatal to the entire company.

Avenger was pushed to the forefront as it offered a quicker time to market than the already delayed Rampage. Avenger was no more than the Banshee core with a second texture mapping unit (TMU) added - the same TMU which Banshee lost compared to Voodoo2. Avenger was thus merely a Voodoo2 with an integrated 128-bit 2D video accelerator and twice the clock speed.

== Architecture and performance ==
Much was made of Voodoo3 (christened 'Avenger') and its 16-bit color rendering limitation. This was in fact quite complex, as Voodoo3 operated to full 32-bit precision (8 bits per channel, 16.7M colours) in its texture mappers and pixel pipeline as opposed to previous products from 3dfx and other vendors, which had only worked in 16-bit precision.

To save framebuffer space, the Voodoo3's rendering output was dithered to 16 bit. This offered better quality than running in pure 16-bit mode. However, a controversy arose over what happened next.

The Voodoo3's RAMDAC, which took the rendered frame from the framebuffer and generated the display image, performed a 2x2 box or 4x1 line filter on the dithered image to almost reconstruct the original 24-bit color render. 3dfx claimed this to be '22-bit' equivalent quality. As such, Voodoo3's framebuffer was not representative of the final output, and therefore, screenshots did not accurately portray Voodoo3's display quality which was actually much closer to the 24-bit outputs of Nvidia's RIVA TNT2 and ATI's Rage 128.

The internal organisation of Avenger was not complex. Pre-setup notably featured a guardband clipper (eventually part of hardware transformation and lighting) but the pixel pipeline was a conventional single-issue, dual-texture design almost identical to that featured on Voodoo2, but capable of working on 32-bit image data as opposed to Voodoo2's pure 16-bit output. Avenger's other remarkable features included the 128-bit GDI accelerator debuted in Banshee. This 2D engine led the Voodoo3 to be considered one of the more high-performance video cards of its generation.

The Voodoo3 2000, 3000 and 3500 differed mainly in clock frequencies (memory and core were synchronous). The clock rates were 143 MHz, 166 MHz and 183 MHz respectively. While this gave the 3000 and 3500 a notable theoretical advantage in multi-textured fillrate over its main rival, the TNT2 clocked at 125 MHz, the TNT2 had nearly twice the single-textured fillrate of the Voodoo3. In addition, the Voodoo3 consisted of one multi-texturing pipeline, the TNT series consisted of twin single texturing pipelines. As a result, Voodoo3 was disadvantaged in games not using multiple texturing. The 2000 and 3000 boards generally differed in their support for TV output; the 3500 boards also carried a TV tuner and provided a wide range of video inputs and outputs.

At the time modern multi-texturing games such as Quake III Arena and Unreal Tournament were considered Voodoo3's performance territory, as Voodoo3's primary competition upon release was the dated RIVA TNT. Nvidia's RIVA TNT2 arrived shortly thereafter and the two traded places frequently in benchmark results.

Although the Voodoo3 was a replacement for the Voodoo2, it was often beaten by Voodoo2 SLI cards in direct comparisons.

Voodoo 3 supported MPEG-2 video acceleration.

Voodoo3 remained performance competitive throughout its life, eventually being comprehensively outclassed by Nvidia's GeForce 256 and ATI's Radeon. 3dfx created the ill-fated Voodoo 5 to counter.

== 3dfx Velocity ==
3dfx released a line of business / value-oriented cards based on the Voodoo3 Avenger chipset. With the purchase of STB Systems, 3dfx had acquired several popular brand names. The Velocity brand had appealed to OEM system builders for years, with boards such as the S3 Graphics ViRGE VX-based STB Velocity 3D and Nvidia RIVA 128-based Velocity 128 being used in many OEM systems from companies such as Gateway. The 3dfx Velocity boards came with only 8 MB of RAM, compared to 16 MB on a regular Voodoo3. In addition, one of the texture management units came disabled as well, making the board more like a Banshee. Enthusiasts discovered that it was possible to enable the disabled TMU with a simple registry alteration. The board's clock speed was set at 143 MHz, exactly the same as a Voodoo3 2000.

== Drivers ==
The last set of drivers officially released for the Voodoo3 on Win9x was version 1.07.00. For Win2000 the latest version is 1.03.00. Dual monitor support with V1.1.3b for Mac OS 8 and 9. After 3dfx shut its doors, 3rd party drivers for Windows 98/98SE, 2000, Me and XP were developed by loyal 3dfx customers. Drivers for Windows XP are still available at Microsoft for download.

== Models ==
Model	Launch	Code name	VGA^{1}	Fab (nm)	Bus interface	Memory (MB)	Core clock (MHz)	Memory clock (MHz)	Core config^{2}	Fillrate				Memory			Direct3D support
Model	Launch	Code name	VGA^{1}	Fab (nm)	Bus interface	Memory (MB)	Core clock (MHz)	Memory clock (MHz)	Core config^{2}	MOperations/s	MPixels/s	MTexels/s	MVertices/s	Bandwidth (GB/s)	Bus type	Bus width (bit)	Direct3D support
Velocity 100	July 26, 1999	Avenger	✓	250	AGP 2x	8	143	143	2:1	143	143	286	0	2.288	SDR	128	6.0
Velocity 200	Never released	Avenger	✓	250	AGP 2x	16	143	143	2:1	143	143	286	0	2.288	SDR	128	6.0
Voodoo3 1000	March 1999	Avenger	✓	250	AGP 2x	8, 16	125, 143	125, 143	2:1	125	125	250	0	2, 2.288	SDR	128	6.0
Voodoo3 2000	April 7, 1999	Avenger	✓	250	AGP 2x, PCI	16	143	143	2:1	143	143	286	0	2.288	SDR	128	6.0
Voodoo3 3000	April 7, 1999	Avenger	✓	250	AGP 2x, PCI	16	166	166	2:1	166	166	333	0	2.66	SDR	128	6.0
Voodoo3 3500 TVsi	April 7, 1999	Avenger	✓	250	AGP 2x	16	166	166	2:1	166	166	333	0	2.66	SDR	128	6.0
Voodoo3 3500 TV	June 1999	Avenger	✓	250	AGP 2x	16	183	183	2:1	183	183	366	0	2.928	SDR	128	6.0
Voodoo3 3500 TV SE	June 1999	Avenger	✓	250	AGP 2x	16	200	200	2:1	200	200	400	0	3.19	SDR	128	6.0

- ^{1} VGA: Whether the card included a built-in VGA subsystem and ran as a standalone graphics card
- ^{2} – 3Dfx Velocity cards only have 1 working TMU enabled on OpenGL and Glide games, but both TMUs working under DirectX games.

== Competing chipsets ==
- Nvidia RIVA TNT2
- ATI Rage 128
- Matrox G400
- S3 Graphics Savage4
