= RIVA TNT =

Graphics Chip by Nvidia

Nvidia RIVA TNT
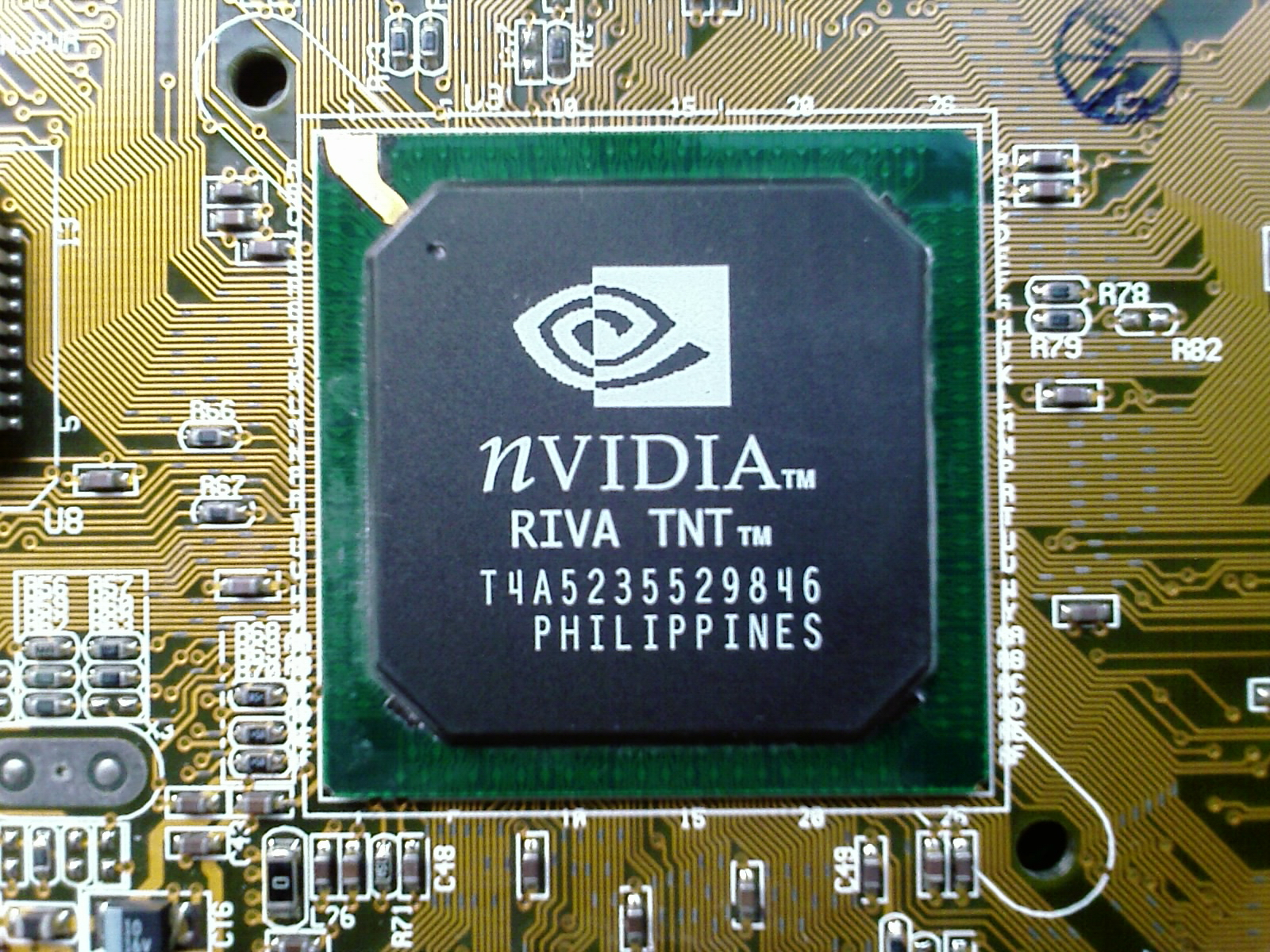
- RIVA TNT GPU
- Release date: August 31, 1998
- Manufactured by: TSMC
- Designed by: Nvidia
- Codename: NV4
- Fabrication process: 350 nm (TNT); 250 nm (Vanta)

Cards
- Entry-level: Vanta
- High-end: TNT

API support
- Direct3D: Direct3D 6.0
- OpenGL: 1.2

History
- Predecessor: RIVA 128
- Successor: RIVA TNT2

Support status
- Unsupported

The RIVA TNT, codenamed NV4, is a 2D, video, and 3D graphics accelerator chip for PCs that was developed by Nvidia, announced in March 1998 and released at the end of August 1998. It cemented Nvidia's reputation as a worthy rival within the developing consumer 3D graphics adapter industry. It succeeded the RIVA 128.

RIVA is an acronym for Real-time Interactive Video and Animation accelerator. The "TNT" suffix refers to the chip's ability to work on two texels at once (Twin Texel).

The first graphics card that was based on the RIVA TNT chip was the Velocity 4400, released by STB Systems on August 31, 1998.

== Overview ==
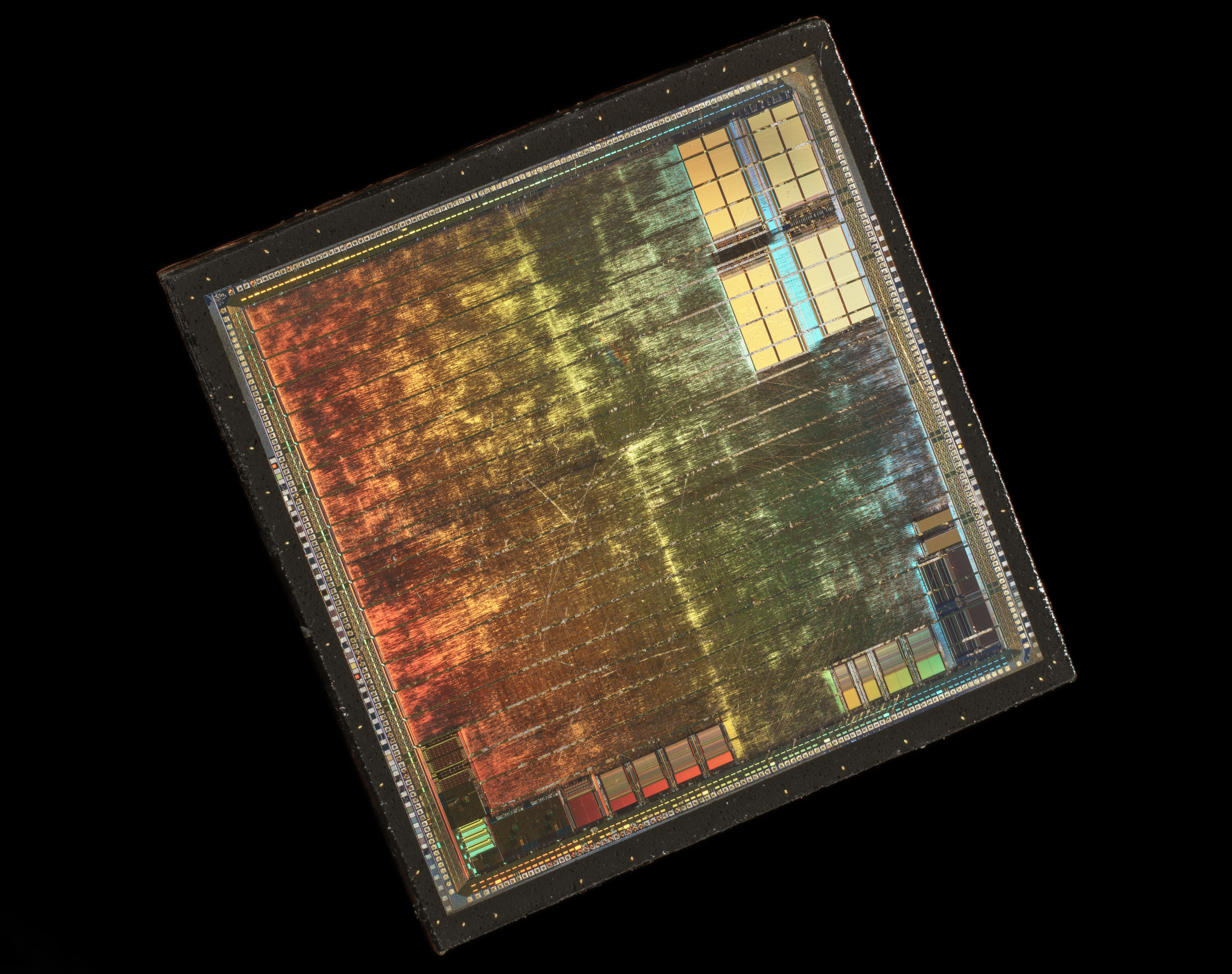
Die shot of the RIVA TNT GPU

The TNT was designed as a follow-up to the RIVA 128 and as a response to 3Dfx's introduction of the Voodoo2. It added a second pixel pipeline, practically doubling rendering speed, and used considerably faster memory. Unlike the Voodoo2 (but like the slower Matrox G200) it also added support for a 32-bit (truecolor) pixel format, 24-bit Z-buffer in 3D mode, an 8-bit stencil buffer and support for 1024×1024 pixel textures. Improved mipmapping and texture filtering techniques, including newly added support for trilinear filtering, dramatically improved quality compared to the TNT's predecessor. TNT also added support for up to 16 MiB of SDRAM. Like RIVA 128, RIVA TNT is a single chip solution.

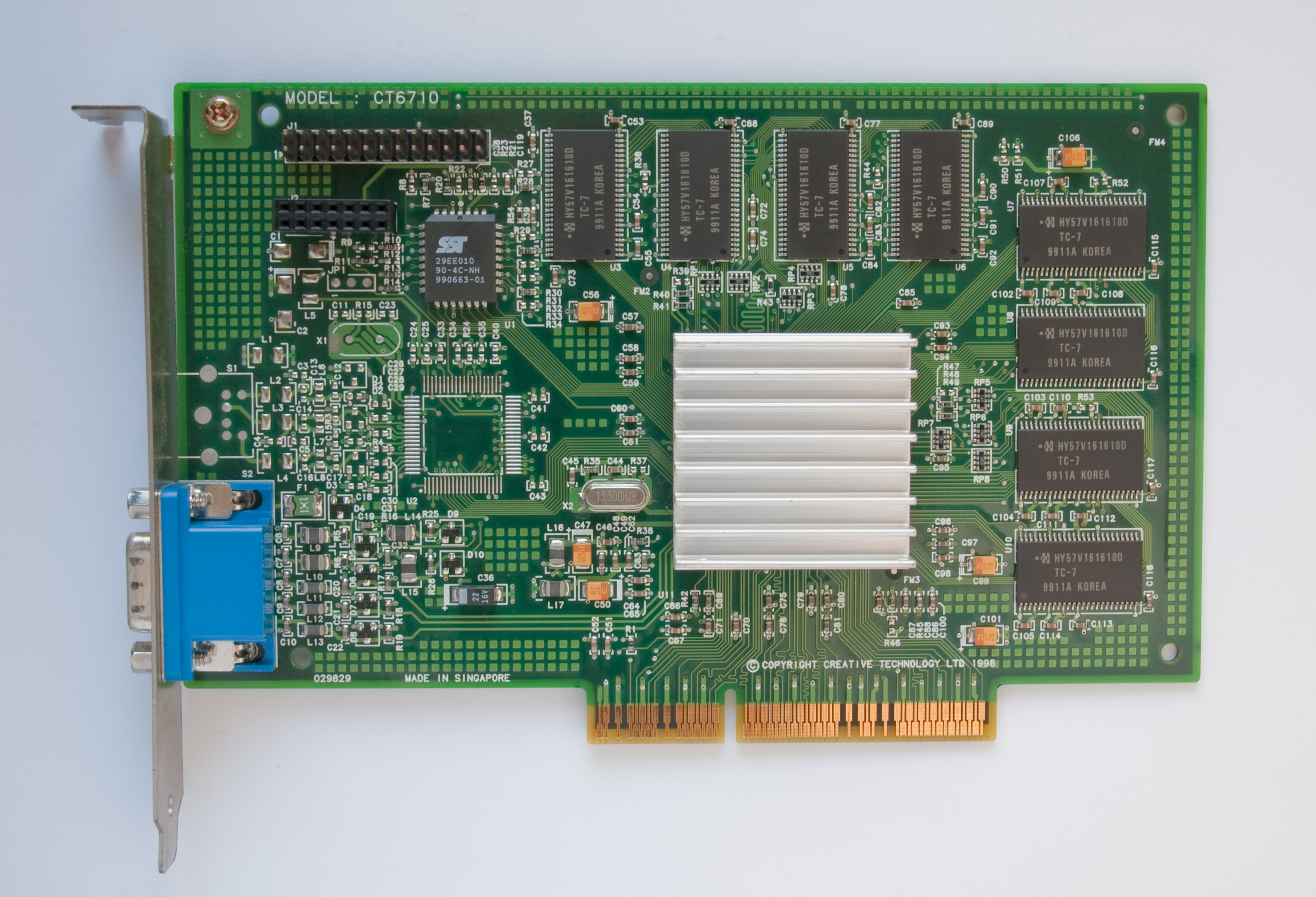
Riva TNT card from Creative Technology

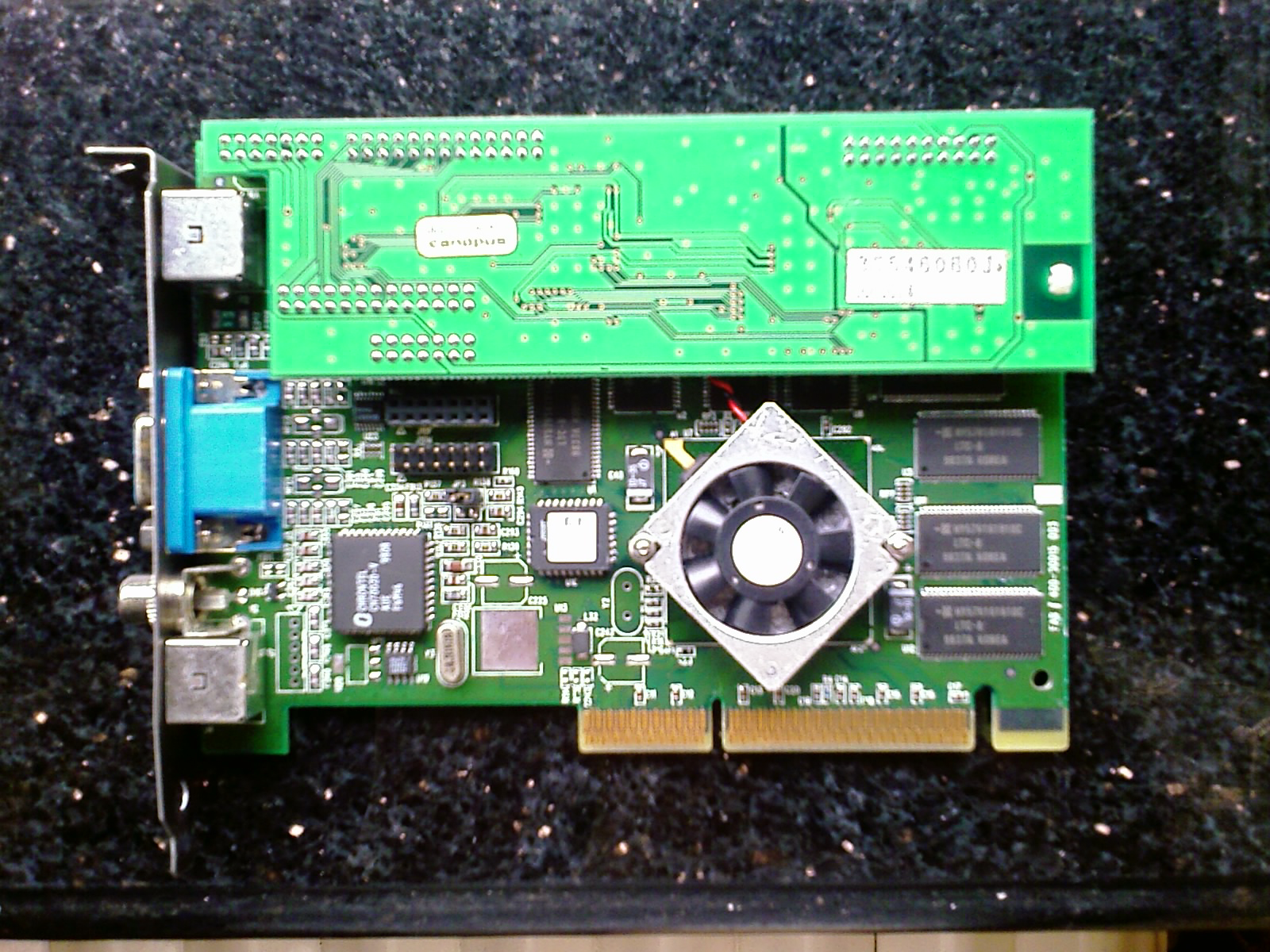
Canopus RIVA TNT AGP

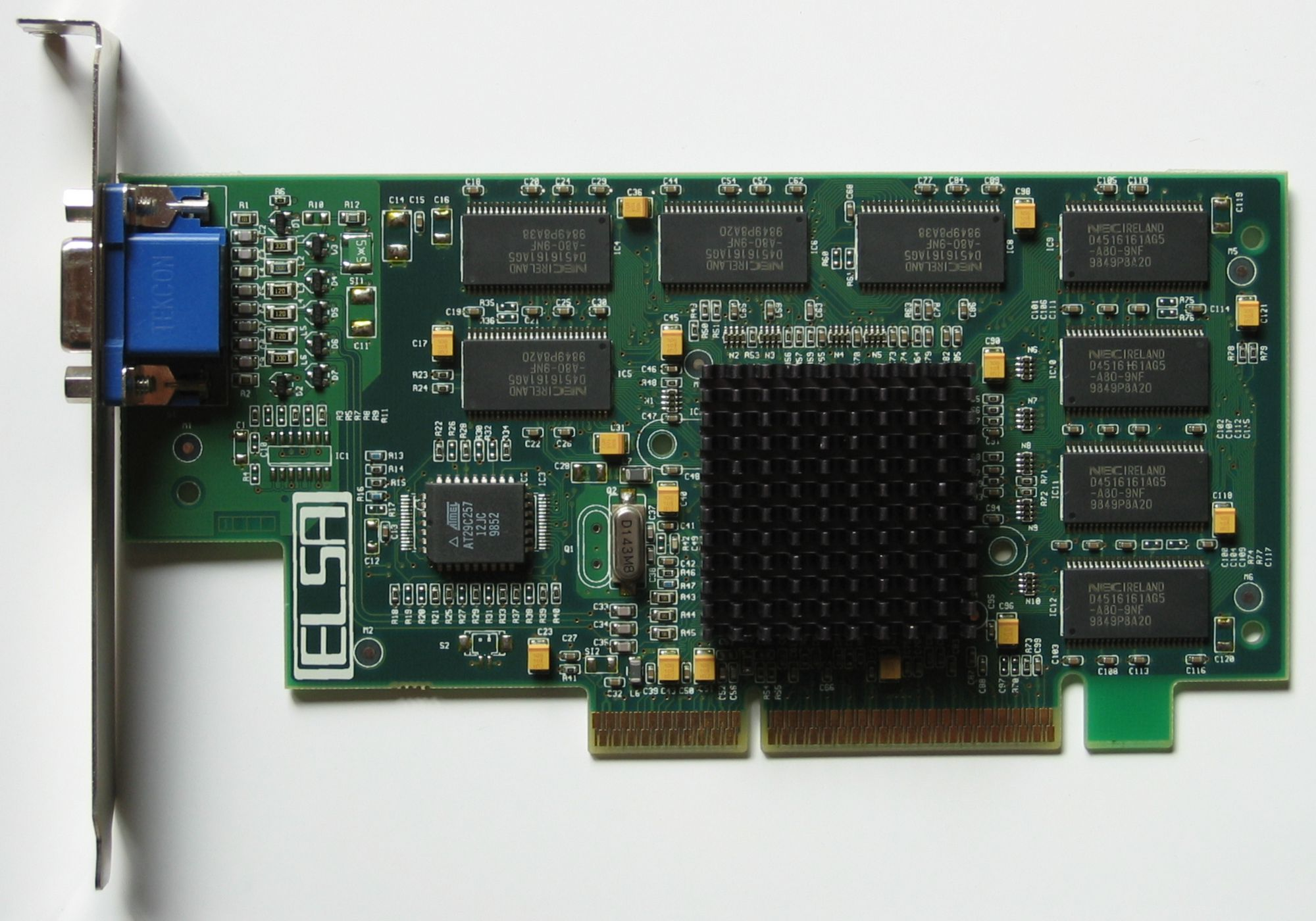
ELSA Erazor II with Nvidia Riva TNT

The TNT shipped later than originally planned, ran quite hot, and was clocked lower than Nvidia had planned at 90 MHz instead of 110 MHz. Originally planned specifications should have placed the card ahead of Voodoo2 in theoretical performance for Direct3D applications, but at 90 MHz it did not quite match the Voodoo2.

At the time, a lot of games supported 3dfx's proprietary Glide API which gave the Voodoo2 a large advantage in speed and image quality, and some games only used the Glide API for 3D acceleration, leaving TNT users no better off than people who didn't have a 3D accelerator. Even in "OpenGL only" comparisons such as the case in Quake 2, the Voodoo2 had the upper hand as a custom "MiniGL" driver was made specifically for 3dfx cards to run the game (and most other OpenGL games at the time). The 3dfx MiniGL driver was not a fully featured OpenGL driver, but a wrapper that mapped certain OpenGL functions to their equivalents in Glide, and was able to attain a speed advantage because of that. Later on when fully featured OpenGL drivers were made for the 3dfx line of cards, it was noticed that it was much slower when compared to its cut down MiniGL brother. The TNT had 32-bit color support while the Voodoo2 only supported 16-bit (although internally dithered down from 24-bit color, beating the TNT in 16bit quality). Voodoo2 cards also gained an even larger speed advantage over the TNT because of the ability to link two Voodoo2 cards together in an "SLI" setup.

TNT did not match the sales of the incredibly popular Voodoo2. 3Dfx's customer mind share was at its peak during this time and Nvidia was still a somewhat new player. Again, like with the RIVA 128, the lack of Glide API support hindered Nvidia's opportunities for market share growth. Glide was considered the best 3D gaming API available by both gamers and developers. However, TNT gained Nvidia much attention and paved the way for the refreshed version called the RIVA TNT2. After all, unlike the rest of the competition, Nvidia had come close to the Voodoo2 in performance in some games, and beaten it in 32bit image quality.

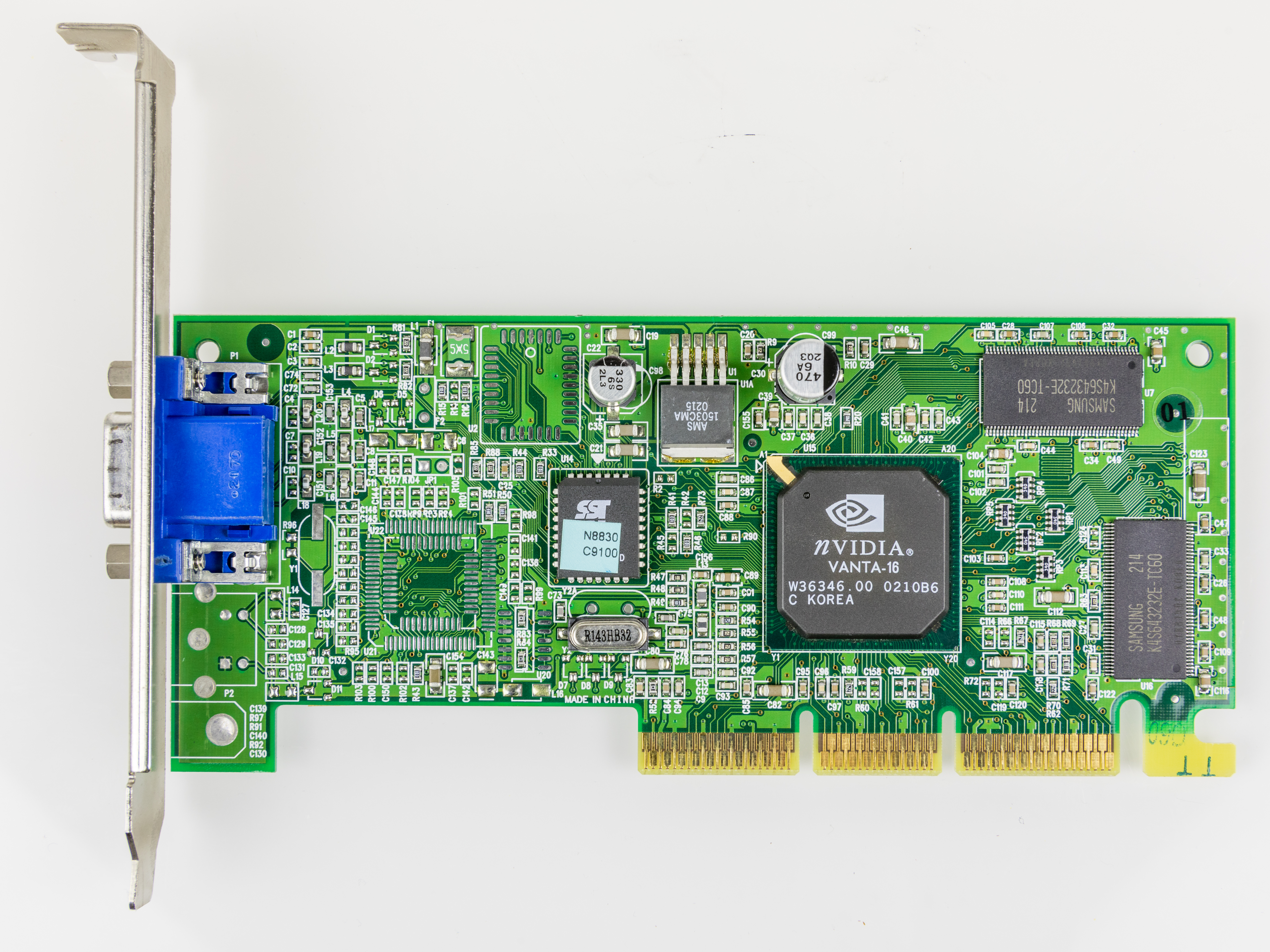
Nvidia MS-8830 with Vanta graphic chip, standard video card in a Compaq Deskpro Evo office computer (2001)

In what would become standard industry practice on a massive scale in later years, Nvidia released a budget version of TNT called Vanta. This board used the same TNT chip but lowered its clock speed and halved both memory data bus width (to 64-bit) and memory size (to 16 MiB). By doing this, Nvidia was able to still sell TNT chips that couldn't reach the TNT's specified clock speeds, a practice known as binning, and cut board costs significantly by using a narrower bus and less RAM. The board proved popular with OEM computer builders because of its capable feature-set and low price. Vanta also was implemented as integrated graphics on some motherboards.

TNT itself was used on several popular cards, such as the Diamond Viper V550 and STB Velocity 4400, both of which managed OEM wins with the likes of Dell and Gateway, among others.

== Drivers ==
Nvidia's driver development with TNT was the beginning of their notably aggressive efforts to maintain the best set of drivers possible. TNT received the first branded driver within the industry, called Detonator.

While the TNT had always performed well on Intel based systems, it previously lagged behind in terms of performance on then current AMD based systems. At the time, Quake2 was the benchmark for performance and the 3dfx-made Voodoo2 enjoyed a large performance difference over the TNT because it had 3DNow! optimizations that negated the performance penalty of the weak, unpipelined FPU on then current AMD processors. The Detonator drivers included 3DNow! optimizations and the TNT's Quake2 performance jumped 30%. In fact, all OpenGL and DirectX applications benefited from such optimizations. This made the TNT a more attractive 3D accelerator for AMD owners than previously.

The Detonator drivers also fixed compatibility issues with motherboards of the time, and improved overall software compatibility.

The TNT was the last Nvidia graphics accelerator to have support for Windows 3.1x.

== Chipset table ==
Model	Launch	Code name	Fab (nm)	Transistors (million)	Die size (mm^{2})	Bus interface	Core clock (MHz)	Core config (Note: Pixel pipelines: texture mapping units: render output units)	Fillrate				Memory					TDP (W)	Latest API support	
Model	Launch	Code name	Fab (nm)	Transistors (million)	Die size (mm^{2})	Bus interface	Core clock (MHz)	Core config	MOps/s	MPixels/s	MTexels/s	MVertices/s	Size (MB)	Clock (MHz)	Bandwidth (GB/s)	Bus type	Bus width (bit)	TDP (W)	Latest API support	
Model	Launch	Code name	Fab (nm)	Transistors (million)	Die size (mm^{2})	Bus interface	Core clock (MHz)	Core config	MOps/s	MPixels/s	MTexels/s	MVertices/s	Size (MB)	Clock (MHz)	Bandwidth (GB/s)	Bus type	Bus width (bit)	TDP (W)	Direct3D	OpenGL
Riva TNT	Aug 31, 1998	NV4	TSMC 350 nm	7	90	AGP 2x, PCI	90	2:2:2	180	180	180	0	8; 16	110	1.76	SDR	128	?	6.0	1.2
Vanta	Mar 22, 1999	NV6	TSMC 250 nm			AGP 4x, PCI	100	2:2:2	200	200	200	0	8; 16	125	1.00	SDR	64	?	6.0	1.2
Vanta LT	Mar 2000	NV6	TSMC 250 nm			AGP 2x	80	2:2:2	160	160	160	0	8; 16	100	0.80	SDR	64	?	6.0	1.2

== Competing chipsets ==
- 3dfx Voodoo2
- 3dfx Voodoo Banshee
- Matrox G200
- ATI Rage Pro
- S3 Savage

== See also ==
- Comparison of Nvidia graphics processing units
