= Radeon 8000 series =

Series of video cards

ATI Radeon 8000 series
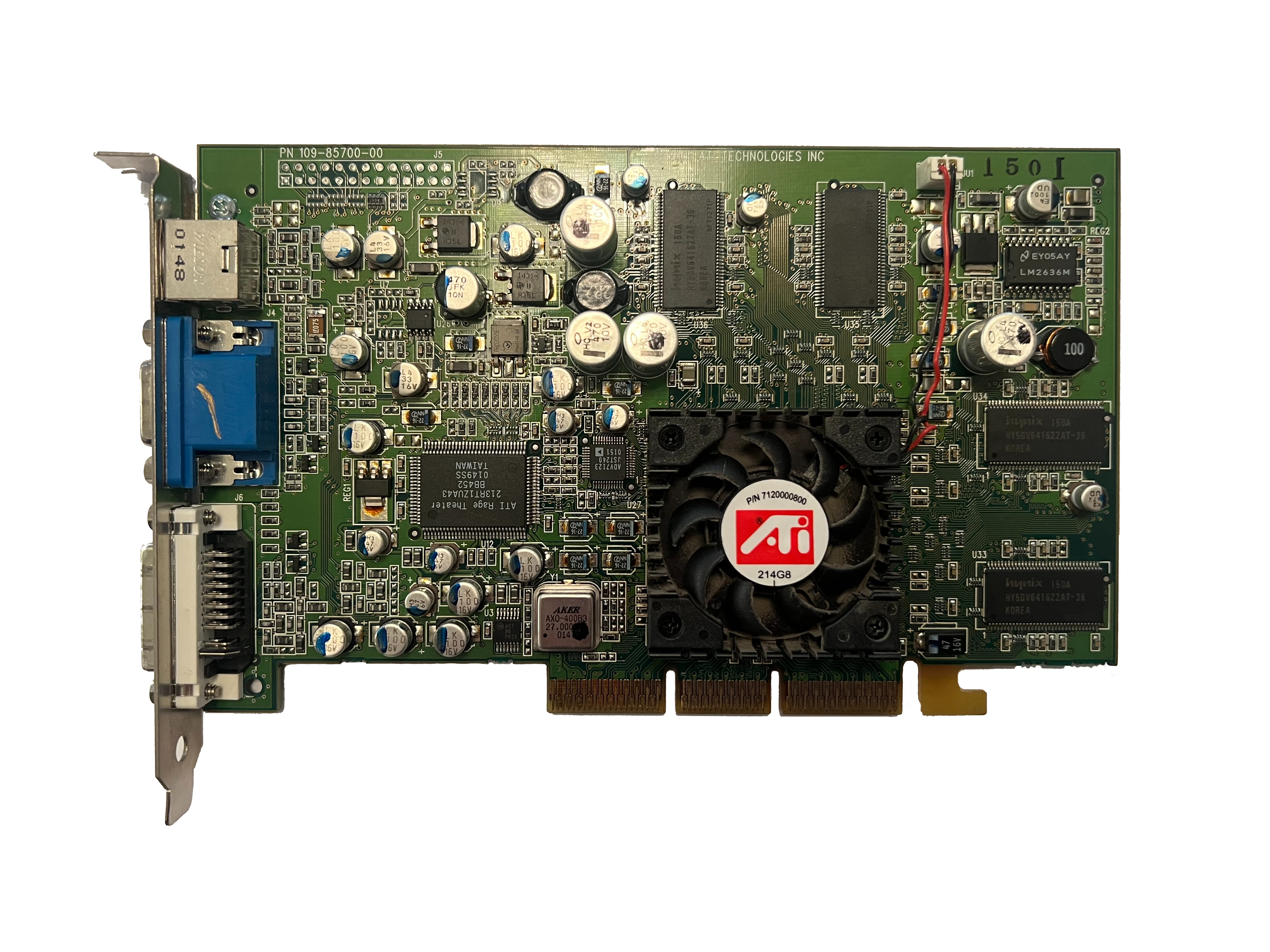
- ATI Radeon 8500 LE With S-Video
- Release date: August 14, 2001; 24 years ago
- Codename: Chaplin
- Architecture: Radeon R200
- Transistors: 60M 150nm (R200): 60M 150nm (R250)

Cards
- Mid-range: 8500LE
- High-end: 8500
- Enthusiast: 8500XT

API support
- Direct3D: Direct3D 8.1; Shader Model 1.4
- OpenGL: OpenGL 1.3

History
- Predecessor: Radeon 7000 series
- Successor: Radeon 9000 series

Support status
- Unsupported

The R200 is the second generation of graphics processing unit used in Radeon graphics cards and developed by ATI Technologies. It features 3D acceleration based upon Microsoft Direct3D 8.1 and OpenGL 1.3, a major improvement in features and performance compared to the preceding Radeon R100 design. It also includes 2D graphical user interface acceleration, video acceleration, and multiple display outputs. "R200" refers to the development codename of the initially released GPU of the generation. It is the basis for a variety of other succeeding products. The Radeon 8500 can also have the ATI Rage Theater chip, allowing for S-Video output.

== Radeon feature matrix ==
The following table shows features of AMD/ATI's GPUs (see also: List of AMD graphics processing units).

Name of GPU series	Wonder	Mach	3D Rage	Rage Pro	Rage 128	R100	R200	R300	R400	R500	R600	RV670	R700	Evergreen	Northern Islands		Southern Islands	Sea Islands	Volcanic Islands	Arctic Islands/Polaris	Vega	Navi 1x	Navi 2x	Navi 3x	Navi 4x
Released	1986	1991	Apr; 1996	Mar; 1997	Aug; 1998	Apr; 2000	Aug; 2001	Sep; 2002	May; 2004	Oct; 2005	May; 2007	Nov; 2007	Jun; 2008	Sep; 2009	Oct; 2010	Dec; 2010	Jan; 2012	Sep; 2013	Jun; 2015	Jun 2016, Apr 2017, Aug 2019	Jun 2017, Feb 2019	Jul; 2019	Nov; 2020	Dec; 2022	Feb; 2025
Marketing Name	Wonder	Mach	3D; Rage	Rage; Pro	Rage; 128	Radeon; 7000	Radeon; 8000	Radeon; 9000	Radeon; X700/X800	Radeon; X1000	Radeon; HD 2000	Radeon; HD 3000	Radeon; HD 4000	Radeon; HD 5000	Radeon; HD 6000		Radeon; HD 7000	Radeon; 200	Radeon; 300	Radeon; 400/500/600	Radeon; RX Vega, Radeon VII	Radeon; RX 5000	Radeon; RX 6000	Radeon; RX 7000	Radeon; RX 9000
AMD support	Ended																			Current					
Kind	2D		3D																						
Instruction set architecture	Not publicly known										TeraScale instruction set						GCN instruction set					RDNA instruction set			
Microarchitecture	Not publicly known					GFX1		GFX2			TeraScale 1 (VLIW5) (GFX3)			TeraScale 2 (VLIW5) (GFX4)	TeraScale 2 (VLIW5) up to 68xx (GFX4)	TeraScale 3 (VLIW4) in 69xx (GFX5)	GCN 1st gen (GFX6)	GCN 2nd gen (GFX7)	GCN 3rd gen (GFX8)	GCN 4th gen (GFX8)	GCN 5th gen (GFX9)	RDNA (GFX10.1)	RDNA 2 (GFX10.3)	RDNA 3 (GFX11)	RDNA 4 (GFX12)
Type	Fixed pipeline (Note: The Radeon 100 Series has programmable pixel shaders, but do not fully comply with DirectX 8 or Pixel Shader 1.0. See article on R100's pixel shaders.)						Programmable pixel & vertex pipelines				Unified shader model														
Direct3D	—		5.0	6.0		7.0	8.1	9.0; 11 (9_2)	9.0b 11 (9_2)	9.0c 11 (9_3)	10.0; 11 (10_0)	10.1; 11 (10_1)		11 (11_0)			11 (11_1); 12 (11_1)	11 (12_0); 12 (12_0)			11 (12_1); 12 (12_1)		11 (12_1); 12 (12_2)		
Shader model	—						1.4	2.0+	2.0b	3.0	4.0	4.1		5.0			5.1	5.1; 6.5			6.7				6.8
OpenGL	—			1.1	1.2	1.3		1.5 (Note: R300, R400 and R500 based cards do not fully comply with OpenGL 2+ as the hardware does not support all types of non-power of two (NPOT) textures.)			3.3			4.6 (Note: OpenGL 4+ compliance requires supporting FP64 shaders and these are emulated on some TeraScale chips using 32-bit hardware.)											
Vulkan	—															1.1 (Note: Vulkan support is theoretically possible but has not been implemented in a stable driver.)	1.3		1.4						
OpenCL	—										Close to Metal		1.1 (not supported by Mesa)	1.2+ (on Linux: 1.1+ (no Image support on Clover, with by Rusticl) with Mesa, 1.2+ on GCN 1.Gen)				2.0+ (Adrenalin driver on Win7+) (on Linux ROCm, Mesa 1.2+ (no Image support in Clover, but in Rusticl with Mesa, 2.0+ and 3.0 with AMD drivers or AMD ROCm), 5th gen: 2.2 win 10+ and Linux RocM 5.0+				2.2+ and 3.0 Windows 8.1+ and Linux ROCm 5.0+ (Mesa Rusticl 1.2+ and 3.0 (2.1+ and 2.2+ wip))			
HSA / ROCm	—																Yes					?			
Video decoding ASIC	—										Avivo/UVD	UVD+	UVD 2	UVD 2.2	UVD 3		UVD 4	UVD 4.2	UVD 5.0 or 6.0	UVD 6.3	UVD 7 (Note: The UVD and VCE were replaced by the Video Core Next (VCN) ASIC in the Raven Ridge APU implementation of Vega.)	VCN 2.0	VCN 3.0	VCN 4.0	VCN 5.0
Video encoding ASIC	—																VCE 1.0	VCE 2.0	VCE 3.0 or 3.1	VCE 3.4	VCE 4.0	VCN 2.0	VCN 3.0	VCN 4.0	VCN 5.0
Fluid Motion (Note: Video processing for video frame rate interpolation technique. In Windows it works as a DirectShow filter in your player. In Linux, there is no support on the part of drivers and / or community.)	No																	Yes				No		?	
Power saving	?										PowerPlay				PowerTune		PowerTune & ZeroCore Power					?			
TrueAudio	—																	Via dedicated DSP		Via shaders					
FreeSync	—																	1; 2							
HDCP (Note: To play protected video content, it also requires card, operating system, driver, and application support. A compatible HDCP display is also needed for this. HDCP is mandatory for the output of certain audio formats, placing additional constraints on the multimedia setup.)	—										?							1.4		2.2		2.3			
PlayReady	—																			3.0	No	3.0			
Supported displays (Note: More displays may be supported with native DisplayPort connections, or splitting the maximum resolution between multiple monitors with active converters.)						1–2	2							2–6								?			4
Max. resolution	?													2–6 × 2560×1600			2–6 × 4096×2160 @ 30 Hz			2–6 × 5120×2880 @ 60 Hz	3 × 7680×4320 @ 60 Hz	7680×4320 @ 60 Hz PowerColor		7680x4320 @165 Hz	7680x4320
/drm/radeon (Note: DRM (Direct Rendering Manager) is a component of the Linux kernel. AMDgpu is the Linux kernel module. Support in this table refers to the most current version.)						Yes													—						
/drm/amdgpu	—																	Optional	Yes						

== Radeon R200 (8xxx, 9xxx) series ==
- All models are manufactured with a 150 nm fabrication process
- All models include DirectX 8.1 and OpenGL 1.4

Model	Launch	Code name	Bus interface	Memory (MiB)	Core clock (MHz)	Memory clock (MHz)	Config core^{1}	Fillrate				Memory		
Model	Launch	Code name	Bus interface	Memory (MiB)	Core clock (MHz)	Memory clock (MHz)	Config core^{1}	MOperations/s	MPixels/s	MTexels/s	MVertices/s	Bandwidth (GB/s)	Bus type	Bus width (bit)
Radeon 8500LE	Oct 30, 2001	R200	AGP 4x	64, 128	250	250	4:2:8:4	1000	1000	2000	125	8	DDR	128
Radeon 8500	Aug 14, 2001	R200	AGP 4x	64, 128	275	275	4:2:8:4	1100	1100	2200	137.5	8.8	DDR	128
Radeon 8500XT	Unreleased	R250	AGP 4x	128	300	300	4:2:8:4	1200	1200	2400	150	9.6	DDR	128

- ^{1} Pixel shaders : Vertex shaders : Texture mapping units : Render output units

== Architecture ==
R200's 3D hardware consists of 4 pixel pipelines, each with 2 texture sampling units. It has 2 vertex shaders and a legacy Direct3D 7 TCL unit, marketed as Charisma Engine II. It is ATI's first Graphics processing unit with programmable pixel and vertex processors, called Pixel Tapestry II and compliant with Direct3D 8.1. R200 has advanced memory bandwidth saving and overdraw reduction hardware called HyperZ II that consists of occlusion culling (hierarchical Z), fast z-buffer clear, and z-buffer compression. The graphics processing unit is capable of dual display output (HydraVision) and is equipped with a video decoding engine (Video Immersion II) with adaptive hardware deinterlacing, temporal filtering, motion compensation, and iDCT.

R200 introduced pixel shader version 1.4 (PS1.4), a significant enhancement to prior PS1.x specifications. Notable instructions include "phase", "texcrd", and "texld". The phase instruction allows a shader program to operate on two separate "phases" (2 passes through the hardware), effectively doubling the maximum number of texture addressing and arithmetic instructions, and potentially allowing the number of passes required for an effect to be reduced. This allows not only more complicated effects, but can also provide a speed boost by utilizing the hardware more efficiently. The "texcrd" instruction moves the texture coordinate values of a texture into the destination register, while the "texld" instruction will load the texture at the coordinates specified in the source register to the destination register.

Compared to R100's 2x3 pixel pipeline architecture, R200's 4x2 design is more robust despite losing one texture unit per pipeline. Each pipeline can now address a total of 6 texture layers per pass. The chip achieves this by using a method known as 'loop-back'. Increasing the number of textures accessed per pass reduces the number of times the card is forced into multi-pass rendering.

The texture filtering capabilities of R200 are also improved over its predecessor. For anisotropic filtering, Radeon 8500 uses a technique similar to that used in R100, but improved with trilinear filtering and some other refinements. However, it is still highly angle-dependent and the driver sometimes forces bilinear filtering for speed. NVIDIA's GeForce 4 Ti series offered a more accurate anisotropic implementation, but with a greater performance impact.

R200 has ATI's first implementation of a hardware-accelerated tessellation engine (a.k.a. higher order surfaces), called Truform, which can automatically increase the geometric complexity of 3D models. The technology requires developer support and is not practical for all scenarios. It can undesirably round-out models. As a result of very limited adoption, ATI dropped TruForm support from its future hardware.

	DirectX 8.0 Pixel Shader 1.1	DirectX 8.1 Pixel Shader 1.4
Max. Texture Inputs	4	6
Max. Program Length	12 instructions (up to 4 texture sampling, 8 color blending)	22 instructions (up to 6 texture sampling, 8 texture addressing, 8 color blending)
Instruction Set	13 address operations, 8 color operations	12 address / color operations
Texture Addressing Modes	40	virtually unlimited

== Performance ==
Radeon 8500's biggest disappointment was its early driver releases. At launch, the card's performance was below expectations and it had numerous software flaws that caused problems with games. The chip's anti-aliasing support was only functional in Direct3D and was very slow. To dampen excitement for 8500, competitor nVidia released their Detonator4 driver package on the same day as most web sites previewed the Radeon 8500. nVidia's drivers were of better quality, and they also further boosted the GeForce 3's performance.

Several hardware review sites discovered that the performance of the Radeon 8500 in some actual game tests was lower than benchmarks reflected. For example, ATI was detecting the executable "Quake3.exe" and forcing the texture filtering quality to much lower than normally produced by the card. HardOCP was the first hardware review web site to bring the issue to the community, and proved its existence by renaming all instances of "Quake" in the executable to "Quack." The result was improved image quality, but lower performance.

However, even with the Detonator4 drivers, the Radeon 8500 was able to outperform the GeForce 3 (which the 8500 was intended to compete against) and in some circumstances its faster revision, the Ti500, the higher clocked derivative Nvidia had rolled out in response to the R200 project. Later, driver updates helped to further close the performance gap between the 8500 and the Ti500, while the 8500 was also significantly less expensive and offered additional multimedia features such as dual-monitor support. Though the GeForce 3 Ti200 did become the first DirectX 8.0 card to offer 128 MiB of video memory, instead of the common 64 MiB norm for high-end cards of the time, it turned out that the GeForce 3's limitations prevented it from taking full advantage of it, while the Radeon 8500 was able to more successfully exploit that potential.

In early 2002, to compete with the cheaper GeForce 3 Ti200 and GeForce 4 MX 460, ATI launched the slower-clocked 8500LE (known as 9100 in Europe) which became popular with original equipment manufacturers and enthusiasts due to its lower price, and overclockability to 8500 levels. Though the GeForce 4 Ti 4600 took the performance crown, it was a top line solution that was priced almost double that of the Radeon 8500 (MSRP of US$350–399 versus US$199), so it did not offer direct competition. With the delayed release of the potentially competitive GeForce 4 Ti 4200, plus ATI's initiative in rolling out 128 MiB versions of the 8500/LE kept the R200 line popular among the mid-high performance niche market. The greater features of the All-In-Wonder (AIW) Radeon 8500 DV and the AIW Radeon 8500 128 MB proved superior to Nvidia's Personal Cinema equivalents which used the faster GeForce 4 Ti 4200.

== Implementations ==
=== Radeon 8500/8500LE ===
ATI's first R200-based card was the Radeon 8500, launched in Aug 14, 2001. In the end of Oct, 2001, ATI launched the Radeon 8500LE (later re-released as the Radeon 9100), an identical chip with a lower clock speed and slower memory. Whereas the full 8500 was clocked at 275 MHz core and 275 MHz RAM, the 8500LE was clocked more conservatively at 250 MHz for the core and 200 or 250 MHz for the RAM. Both video cards were first released in 64 MB DDR SDRAM configurations; the later 128 MB Radeon 8500 boards received a small performance boost resulting from a memory interleave mode.

In November 2001 was the release of the All-In-Wonder Radeon 8500 DV, with 64 MB and a slower clock speed like the 8500LE. In 2002, three 128 MB cards were rolled out, the Radeon 8500, 8500LE, and the All-In-Wonder Radeon 8500 128 MB, which was clocked at full 8500 speeds but had fewer video-related features than the AIW 8500 DV. ATI claimed that the lower clock speed for the 8500DV was due to the FireWire interface.

=== Radeon 8500XT (canceled) ===
An updated chip, the Radeon 8500XT (R250) was planned for a mid-2002 release, to compete against the GeForce 4 Ti line, particularly the top line Ti 4600 (which retailed for an MSRP of $350–399 USD). Prerelease information touted a 300 MHz core and RAM clock speed for the "R250" chip.

A Radeon 8500 running at 300 MHz clock speeds would have hardly defeated the GeForce 4 Ti4600, let alone a newer card from NVIDIA. At best it could have been a better performing mid-range solution than the lower-complexity Radeon 9000 (RV250, see below), but it would also have cost more to produce and would have been poorly suited to the Radeon 9000's dual laptop/desktop roles due to die size and power draw. Notably, overclockers found that Radeon 8500 and Radeon 9000 could not reliably overclock to 300 MHz without additional voltage, so undoubtedly R250 would have had similar issues because of its greater complexity and equivalent manufacturing technology, and this would have resulted in poor chip yields, and thus, higher costs.

ATI, perhaps mindful of what had happened to 3dfx when they took focus off their "Rampage" processor, abandoned the R250 refresh in favor of finishing off their next-generation DirectX 9.0 card which was released as the Radeon 9700. This proved to be a wise move, as it enabled ATI to take the lead in development for the first time instead of trailing NVIDIA. The new Radeon 9700 flagship, with its next-generation architecture giving it unprecedented features and performance, would have been superior to any R250 refresh, and it easily took the performance crown from the Ti4600.

== Drivers ==
=== Unix-related operating systems ===
The open-source drivers from X.org/Mesa support almost all features provided by the R200 hardware. They are shipped by default on most BSDs and Linux systems. Newer ATI Catalyst drivers do not offer support for any R500 or older architecture product.

=== Windows drivers ===
This series of Radeon graphics cards is supported by AMD under Microsoft Windows operating systems including Windows XP (except x64), Windows 2000, Windows Me, and Windows 98. Other operating systems may have support in the form of a generic driver that lacks complete support for the hardware. Driver development for the R200 line ended with the Catalyst 6.11 drivers for Windows XP.

=== Mac OS and Mac OS X ===
Apple never shipped a Radeon 8000 series graphics card with any Power Mac, either stock or BTO, preferring to jump directly from the Radeon 7000 series (which was only available as a BTO option on the Power Mac G4 "Digital Audio") to the Radeon 9000 (as the default graphics card on most Power Mac G4 "Mirrored Drive Doors" models). Instead, various Nvidia cards filled the gap. However, ATI themselves released a retail 8500 Mac Edition, compatible with Mac OS 9.2.2 and Mac OS X and targeted at Mac gamers, but despite the name the card was actually based on the 8500LE with a 250 MHz clock and 64MB of memory.

=== MorphOS ===
The R200 series of Radeon graphics cards is supported by MorphOS.

== See also ==
- Radeon R200
- Comparison of ATI Graphics Processing Units
- List of AMD graphics processing units
