= Irregular z-buffer =

The irregular z-buffer is an algorithm designed to solve the visibility problem in real-time 3-d computer graphics. It is related to the classical z-buffer in that it maintains a depth value for each image sample and uses these to determine which geometric elements of a scene are visible. The key difference, however, between the classical z-buffer and the irregular z-buffer is that the latter allows arbitrary placement of image samples in the image plane, whereas the former requires samples to be arranged in a regular grid.

These depth samples are explicitly stored in a two-dimensional spatial data structure. During rasterization, triangles are projected onto the image plane as usual, and the data structure is queried to determine which samples overlap each projected triangle. Finally, for each overlapping sample, the standard z-compare and (conditional) frame buffer update are performed.

== Implementation ==
The classical rasterization algorithm projects each polygon onto the image plane, and determines which sample points from a regularly spaced set lie inside the projected polygon. Since the locations of these samples (i.e. pixels) are implicit, this determination can be made by testing the edges against the implicit grid of sample points. If, however the locations of the sample points are irregularly spaced and cannot be computed from a formula, then this approach does not work. The irregular z-buffer solves this problem by storing sample locations explicitly in a two-dimensional spatial data structure, and later querying this structure to determine which samples lie within a projected triangle. This latter step is referred to as "irregular rasterization".

Although the particular data structure used may vary from implementation to implementation, the two studied approaches are the kd-tree, and a grid of linked lists. A balanced kd-tree implementation has the advantage that it guarantees O(log(N)) access. Its chief disadvantage is that parallel construction of the kd-tree may be difficult, and traversal requires expensive branch instructions. The grid of lists has the advantage that it can be implemented more effectively on GPU hardware, which is designed primarily for the classical z-buffer.

With the appearance of CUDA, the programmability of current graphics hardware has been drastically improved. The Master Thesis, "Fast Triangle Rasterization using irregular Z-buffer on CUDA" (see External links), provides a complete description to an irregular z-buffer based shadow mapping software implementation on CUDA. The rendering system is running completely on GPUs. It is capable of generating aliasing-free shadows at a throughput of dozens of million triangles per second.

More recent irregular z-buffer implementations have transitioned to the standard graphics pipeline as exemplified by Chris Wyman's 2016 work on "Frustum-Traced Irregular Z-Buffers". Rather than relying solely on the compute pipeline, this approach leverages hardware-accelerated conservative rasterization and early-Z culling. Conservative rasterization is necessary because IZB samples can be located anywhere within a light-space texel, and standard rasterization (which only samples pixel centers) would fail to test triangles against all relevant samples.

== Applications ==
The irregular z-buffer can be used for any application which requires visibility calculations at arbitrary locations in the image plane. It has been shown to be particularly adept at shadow mapping, an image space algorithm for rendering hard shadows. In addition to shadow rendering, potential applications include adaptive anti-aliasing, jittered sampling, and environment mapping.

== See also ==
- HyperZ
