= HyperZ =

Brand for a set of GPU processing techniques by ATI

HyperZ

HyperZ is the brand name for a set of processing techniques developed by ATI Technologies—which later merged with Advanced Micro Devices (AMD)—and implemented in its Radeon-GPUs. HyperZ was announced in November 2000 and was still available in the TeraScale-based Radeon HD 2000 Series and in Graphics Core Next-based graphics products.

On the Radeon R100-based cores, Radeon DDR through 7500, where HyperZ debuted, ATI claimed a 20% improvement in overall rendering efficiency. It stated that with HyperZ, Radeon could be said to offer 1.5 gigatexels per second fillrate performance instead of the card's apparent theoretical rate of 1.2 gigatexels. In testing it was shown that HyperZ did indeed offer a tangible performance improvement that allowed the less endowed Radeon to keep up with the less efficient GeForce 2 GTS.

== Functionality ==
HyperZ consists of three mechanisms:

Z compression
The Z-buffer is stored in a lossless compressed format to minimize the z-buffer bandwidth as Z read or writes are taking place. The compression scheme ATI used on Radeon 8500 operated 20% more effectively than on the original Radeon and Radeon 7500.
Fast Z clear
Rather than writing zeros throughout the entire Z-buffer, and thus using the bandwidth of another Z-Buffer write, a Fast Z Clear technique is used that can tag entire blocks of the Z-Buffer as cleared, such that only each of these blocks need be tagged as cleared. On Radeon 8500, ATI claimed that this process could clear the Z-Buffer up to approximately 64 times faster than that of a card without fast Z clear.
Hierarchical Z-buffer
This feature allows for the pixel being rendered to be checked against the z-buffer before the pixel actually arrives in the rendering pipelines. This allows useless pixels to be thrown out early (early Z reject), before the Radeon has to render them.

== Versions of HyperZ ==
With each new microarchitecture, ATI has revised and improved the technology.

- HyperZ – R100
- HyperZ II – R200 (8500-9250)
- HyperZ III – R300 in Radeon 9700
- HyperZ III+ – R350 used in Radeon 9800, Radeon 9800 XL, Radeon 9800 Pro and Radeon 9800 SE
- HyperZ HD – R420 used in Radeon X700 to Radeon X850 XT PE

== See also ==
- Irregular Z-buffer
- Depth map
- Rasterization
