= Radeon =

Brand of computer products

- Release date: 1 April 2000; 26 years ago by ATI
- Manufactured by: ATI; AMD; Samsung; TSMC
- Designed by: ATI (2000–2006); AMD (2006–present)
- Models: 2000–02: 7000, 8000, 9000 series: 2004–05: X300-X600, X700, X800, X1000 series; 2007–13: HD 2000, HD 3000, HD 4000, HD 5000, HD 6000, HD 7000, HD 8000 series; 2013–present: R5/R7/R9 200, R5/R7/R9 300, RX 400, RX 500, RX Vega, RX 5000, RX 6000, RX 7000, RX 9000 series
Transistors
R100	30M	180 nm
R200	60M	150 nm
R360	117M	150 nm
R481	160M	130 nm
RV410	120M	110 nm
R580	384M	80 nm
R600	700M	80 nm
RV670	666M	55 nm
RV790	959M	55 nm
Cypress	2,154M	40 nm
Cayman	2,640M	40 nm
Tahiti	4,313M	28 nm
Hawaii	6,200M	28 nm
Fiji	8,900M	28 nm
Polaris	5,700M	14 nm
Vega	12,500M	14 nm
Vega II	13,230M	7 nm
Navi	10,300M	7 nm
Navi 2X	26,800M	7 nm
Navi 3X	58,000M	5 nm
Navi 4X	53,900M	4 nm
- Fabrication process: 180 nm to 4 nm

History
- Predecessor: Rage

Radeon (/ˈreɪdiɒn/) is a brand of computer products, including graphics processing units, random-access memory, RAM disk software, and solid-state drives, produced by Radeon Technologies Group, a division of AMD. The brand was launched in 2000 by ATI Technologies, which was acquired by AMD in 2006 for US$5.4 billion.

== Radeon Graphics ==
Radeon Graphics is the successor to the Rage line. Four different families of microarchitectures can be roughly distinguished, the fixed-pipeline family, the unified shader model-families of TeraScale, Graphics Core Next, and RDNA. ATI/AMD have developed different technologies, such as TruForm, HyperMemory, HyperZ, XGP, Eyefinity for multi-monitor setups, PowerPlay for power-saving, CrossFire (for multi-GPU) or Hybrid Graphics. A range of SIP blocks is also to be found on certain models in the Radeon products line: Unified Video Decoder, Video Coding Engine and TrueAudio.

The brand was previously only known as "ATI Radeon" until August 2010, when it was renamed to increase AMD's brand awareness on a global scale. Products up to and including the HD 5000 series are branded as ATI Radeon, while the HD 6000 series and beyond use the new AMD Radeon branding.

On 11 September 2015, AMD's GPU business was split into a separate unit known as Radeon Technologies Group, with Raja Koduri as Senior Vice President and chief architect.

=== Radeon graphics card brands ===
AMD does not distribute Radeon cards directly to consumers (though some exceptions can be found). Instead, it sells Radeon GPUs to third-party manufacturers, who build and sell the Radeon-based video cards to the OEM and retail channels. Manufacturers of the Radeon cards—some of whom also make motherboards—include ASRock, Asus, Biostar, Club 3D, Diamond, Force3D, Gainward, Gigabyte, HIS, PowerColor, Sapphire, VisionTek, and XFX.

== Graphics processor generations ==
Generations timeline Fixed-pipeline family TeraScale-family Graphics Core Next-family RDNA-family
2000	Radeon R100
2001	Radeon R200
2002	Radeon R300
2003
2004	Radeon R400
2005	Radeon R500
2006
2007	Radeon R600
2007	Radeon RV670
2008	Radeon R700
2009	Evergreen
2010	Northern Islands
2011
2012	Southern Islands
2013	Sea Islands
2014
2015	Volcanic Islands
2016	Arctic Islands
2017	Polaris
2017	Vega
2018
2019	Navi
2020	Navi 2X
2021
2022	Navi 3X
2023
2024
2025	Navi 4X

Early generations were identified with a number and major/minor alphabetic prefix. Later generations were assigned code names. New or heavily redesigned architectures have a prefix of R (e.g., R300 or R600) while slight modifications are indicated by the RV prefix (e.g., RV370 or RV635).

The first derivative architecture, RV200, did not follow the scheme used by later parts.

=== Fixed-pipeline family ===
==== R100/RV200 ====
The Radeon, first introduced in 2000, was ATI's first graphics processor to be fully DirectX 7 compliant. R100 brought with it large gains in bandwidth and fill-rate efficiency through the new HyperZ technology.

The RV200 was a die-shrink of the former R100 with some core logic tweaks for clockspeed, introduced in 2002. The only release in this generation was the Radeon 7500, which introduced little in the way of new features but offered substantial performance improvements over its predecessors.

==== R200 ====
ATI's second generation Radeon included a sophisticated pixel shader architecture. This chipset implemented Microsoft's pixel shader 1.4 specification for the first time.

Its performance relative to competitors was widely perceived as weak, and subsequent revisions of this generation were cancelled to focus on development of the next generation.

==== R300/R350 ====
The R300 was the first GPU to fully support Microsoft's DirectX 9.0 technology upon its release in 2001. It incorporated fully programmable pixel and vertex shaders.

About a year later, the architecture was revised to allow for higher frequencies, more efficient memory access, and several other improvements in the R350 family. A budget line of RV350 products was based on this refreshed design with some elements disabled or removed.

Models using the new PCI Express interface were introduced in 2004. Using 110-nm and 130-nm manufacturing technologies under the X300 and X600 names, respectively, the RV370 and RV380 graphics processors were used extensively by consumer PC manufacturers.

==== R420 ====
While heavily based upon the previous generation, this line included extensions to the Shader Model 2 feature-set. Shader Model 2b, the specification ATI and Microsoft defined with this generation, offered somewhat more shader program flexibility.

==== R520 ====
ATI's DirectX 9.0c series of graphics cards, with complete shader Model 3.0 support. Launched in October 2005, this series brought a number of enhancements including the floating point render target technology necessary for HDR rendering with anti-aliasing.

=== TeraScale-family ===
==== R600 ====
ATI's first series of GPUs to replace the old fixed-pipeline and implement unified shader model. Subsequent revisions tuned the design for higher performance and energy efficiency, resulting in the ATI Mobility Radeon HD series for mobile computers.

==== R700 ====
Based on the R600 architecture. Mostly a bolstered with many more stream processors, with improvements to power consumption and GDDR5 support for the high-end RV770 and RV740(HD4770) chips. It arrived in late June 2008. The HD 4850 and HD 4870 have 800 stream processors and GDDR3 and GDDR5 memory, respectively. The 4890 was a refresh of 4870 with the same amount of stream processors yet higher clock rates due to refinements. The 4870x2 has 1600 stream processors and GDDR5 memory on an effective 512-bit memory bus with 230.4 Gbit/s video memory bandwidth available.

==== Evergreen ====
The series was launched on 23 September 2009. It featured a 40 nm fabrication process for the entire product line (only the HD4770 (RV740) was built on this process previously), with more stream cores and compatibility with the next major version of the DirectX API, DirectX 11, which launched on 22 October 2009 along with Microsoft Windows 7. The Rxxx/RVxxx codename scheme was scrapped entirely. The initial launch consisted of only the 5870 and 5850 models. ATI released beta drivers that introduced full OpenGL 4.0 support on all variants of this series in March 2010.

==== Northern Islands ====
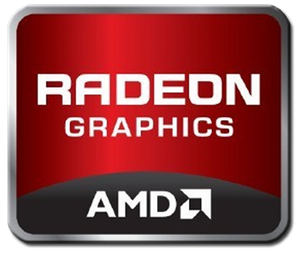
Radeon logo from 2011 to 2013

This is the first series to be marketed solely under the "AMD" brand. It features a 3rd generation 40 nm design, rebalancing the existing architecture with redesigned shaders to give it better performance. It was released first on 22 October 2010, in the form of the 6850 and 6870. 3D output is enabled with HDMI 1.4a and DisplayPort 1.2 outputs.

=== Graphics Core Next-family ===
AMD Radeon logo from 26 May 2016 – 27 October 2020

==== Southern Islands ====
"Southern Islands" was the first series to feature the new compute microarchitecture known as "Graphics Core Next"(GCN). GCN was used among the higher end cards, while the VLIW5 architecture utilized in the previous generation was used in the lower end, OEM products. However, the Radeon HD 7790 uses GCN 2, and was the first product in the series to be released by AMD on 9 January 2012.

==== Sea Islands ====
The "Sea Islands" were OEM rebadges of the 7000 series, with only three products, code named Oland, available for general retail. The series, just like the "Southern Islands", used a mixture of VLIW5 models and GCN models for its desktop products.

==== Volcanic Islands ====
"Volcanic Islands" GPUs were introduced with the AMD Radeon RX 200 series, and were first released in late 2013. The Radeon RX 200 line is mainly based on AMD's GCN architecture, with the lower end, OEM cards still using VLIW5. The majority of desktop products use GCN 1, while the R9 290x/290 & R7 260X/260 use GCN 2, and with only the R9 285 using the new GCN 3.

==== Caribbean Islands ====
GPUs codenamed "Caribbean Islands" were introduced with the AMD Radeon RX 300 series, released in 2015. This series was the first to solely use GCN based models, ranging from GCN 1st to GCN 3rd Gen, including the GCN 3-based Fiji-architecture models named Fury X, Fury, Nano and the Radeon Pro Duo.

==== Arctic Islands ====
GPUs codenamed "Arctic Islands" were first introduced with the Radeon RX 400 series in June 2016 with the announcement of the RX 480. These cards were the first to use the new Polaris chips which implements GCN 4th Gen on the 14 nm fab process. The RX 500 series released in April 2017 also uses Polaris chips.

=== RDNA-family ===
==== RDNA 1 ====
On 27 May 2019, at COMPUTEX 2019, AMD announced the new 'RDNA' graphics micro-architecture, which succeeded the Graphics Core Next micro-architecture. This is the basis for the Radeon RX 5700-series graphics cards, the first to be built under the codename 'Navi'. These cards feature GDDR6 SGRAM and support for PCI Express 4.0.

==== RDNA 2 ====
On 5 March 2020, AMD publicly announced its plan to release a "refresh" of the RDNA micro-architecture. Dubbed as the RDNA 2 architecture, it was stated to succeed the first-gen RDNA micro-architecture and was initially scheduled for a release in Q4 2020. RDNA 2 was confirmed as the graphics microarchitecture featured in the Xbox Series X and Series S consoles from Microsoft, and PlayStation 5 from Sony, with proprietary tweaks and different GPU configurations in each systems' implementation.

AMD unveiled the Radeon RX 6000 series, its next-gen RDNA 2 graphics cards at an online event on 28 October 2020. The lineup consists of the RX 6800, RX 6800 XT and RX 6900 XT. The RX 6800 and 6800 XT launched on 18 November 2020, with the RX 6900 XT being released on 8 December 2020. Further variants including a Radeon RX 6700 (XT) series based on Navi 22, launched on 18 March 2021, a Radeon RX 6600(XT) series based on Navi 23, launched on 11 August 2021 (that is the 6600XT release date, the RX 6600 launched on 13 October 2021), and a Radeon RX 6500(XT), launched on 19 January 2022.

==== RDNA 3 ====
On 3 November 2022, AMD announced the full details for the RDNA 3 micro-architecture along with the RX 7900 XT and RX 7900 XTX at an event in Las Vegas.

==== RDNA 4 ====
On 28 February 2025, AMD announced the RDNA 4 micro-architecture along with the RX 9070 and the RX 9070 XT at an online event. On 21 May 2025, AMD announced the RX 9060 XT during its Computex keynote.

=== API overview ===
Some generations vary from their predecessors predominantly due to architectural improvements, while others were adapted primarily to new manufacturing processes with fewer functional changes. The table below summarizes the APIs supported in each Radeon generation (including pre-Radeon ATI GPUs). Also see AMD FireStream and AMD FirePro branded products. The following table shows the graphics and compute APIs support across ATI/AMD GPU microarchitectures. Note that this table include microarchitectures used in ATI products prior to Radeon, and a branding series might include older generation chips.

Chip series	Microarchitecture	Fab	Supported APIs					AMD support	Year introduced	Introduced with
Chip series	Microarchitecture	Fab	Rendering			Computing / ROCm		AMD support	Year introduced	Introduced with
Chip series	Microarchitecture	Fab	Vulkan	OpenGL	Direct3D	HSA	OpenCL	AMD support	Year introduced	Introduced with
Wonder	Fixed-pipeline (Note: Radeon 7000 Series has programmable pixel shaders, but do not fully comply with DirectX 8 or Pixel Shader 1.0. See article on R100's pixel shaders.)	1000 nm 800 nm	—N/a	—N/a	—N/a	—N/a	—N/a	Ended	1986	Graphics Solutions
Mach	Fixed-pipeline	800 nm 600 nm	—N/a	—N/a	—N/a	—N/a	—N/a	Ended	1991	Mach8
3D Rage	Fixed-pipeline	500 nm	—N/a	—N/a	5.0	—N/a	—N/a	Ended	1996	3D Rage
Rage Pro	Fixed-pipeline	350 nm	—N/a	1.1	6.0	—N/a	—N/a	Ended	1997	Rage Pro
Rage 128	Fixed-pipeline	250 nm	—N/a	1.2	6.0	—N/a	—N/a	Ended	1998	Rage 128 GL/VR
R100	Fixed-pipeline	180 nm 150 nm	—N/a	1.3	7.0	—N/a	—N/a	Ended	2000	Radeon
R200	Programmable pixel & vertex pipelines	150 nm	—N/a	1.3	8.1	—N/a	—N/a	Ended	2001	Radeon 8500
R300	Programmable pixel & vertex pipelines	150 nm 130 nm 110 nm	—N/a	2.0 (Note: These series do not fully comply with OpenGL 2+ as the hardware does not support all types of non-power-of-two (NPOT) textures.)	9.0; 11 (FL 9_2)	—N/a	—N/a	Ended	2002	Radeon 9700
R420	Programmable pixel & vertex pipelines	130 nm 110 nm	—N/a	2.0	9.0b 11 (FL 9_2)	—N/a	—N/a	Ended	2004	Radeon X800
R520	Programmable pixel & vertex pipelines	90 nm 80 nm	—N/a	2.0	9.0c 11 (FL 9_3)	—N/a	—N/a	Ended	2005	Radeon X1800
R600	TeraScale 1	80 nm 65 nm	—N/a	3.3	10.0; 11 (FL 10_0)	—N/a	ATI Stream	Ended	2007	Radeon HD 2900 XT
RV670	TeraScale 1	55 nm	—N/a	3.3	10.1; 11 (FL 10_1)	—N/a	ATI Stream APP	Ended	2007	Radeon HD 3850/3870
RV770	TeraScale 1	55 nm 40 nm	—N/a	3.3	10.1; 11 (FL 10_1)	—N/a	1.0	Ended	2008	Radeon HD 4850/4870
Evergreen	TeraScale 2	40 nm	—N/a	4.5 (Linux 4.2-4.6) (Note: OpenGL 4+ compliance requires supporting FP64 shaders and these are emulated on some TeraScale chips using 32-bit hardware.)	11 (FL 11_0)	—N/a	1.2	Ended	2009	Radeon HD 5850/5870
Northern Islands	TeraScale 2 TeraScale 3	40 nm	—N/a	4.5 (Linux 4.2-4.6)	11 (FL 11_0)	—N/a	1.2	Ended	2010	Radeon HD 6850/6870; Radeon HD 6950/6970
Southern Islands	GCN 1^{st} gen	28 nm	1.0 (Windows) 1.3 (Linux)	4.6	11 (FL 11_1); 12 (FL11_1)	Yes	1.2; 2.0 possible	Ended	2012	Radeon HD 7950/7970
Sea Islands	GCN 2^{nd} gen	28 nm	1.2 (Windows) 1.3 (Linux)	4.6	11 (FL 12_0); 12 (FL 12_0)	Yes	2.0 (1.2 in MacOS, Linux); 2.1 Beta in Linux ROCm; 2.2 possible	Ended	2013	Radeon HD 7790
Volcanic Islands	GCN 3^{rd} gen	28 nm	1.2 (Windows) 1.4 (Linux)	4.6	11 (FL 12_0); 12 (FL 12_0)	Yes	2.0 (1.2 in MacOS, Linux); 2.1 Beta in Linux ROCm; 2.2 possible	Ended	2014	Radeon R9 285
Arctic Islands	GCN 4^{th} gen	28 nm 14 nm	1.3 (Windows) 1.4 (Linux)	4.6	11 (FL 12_0); 12 (FL 12_0)	Yes	2.0 (1.2 in MacOS, Linux); 2.1 Beta in Linux ROCm; 2.2 possible	Supported	2016	Radeon RX 480
Polaris	GCN 4^{th} gen	28 nm 14 nm	1.3 (Windows) 1.4 (Linux)	4.6	11 (FL 12_0); 12 (FL 12_0)	Yes	2.0 (1.2 in MacOS, Linux); 2.1 Beta in Linux ROCm; 2.2 possible	Supported	2017	Radeon 520/530; Radeon RX 530/550/570/580
Vega	GCN 5^{th} gen	14 nm 7 nm	1.3 (Windows) 1.4 (Linux)	4.6	11 (FL 12_1); 12 (FL 12_1)	Yes	2.0 (1.2 in MacOS, Linux); 2.1 Beta in Linux ROCm; 2.2 possible	Supported	2017	Radeon Vega Frontier Edition
Navi	RDNA	7 nm	1.4	4.6	11 (FL 12_1); 12 (FL 12_1)	Yes	2.0 (1.2 in MacOS, Linux); 2.1 Beta in Linux ROCm; 2.2 possible	Supported	2019	Radeon RX 5700 (XT)
Navi 2x	RDNA 2	7 nm 6 nm	1.4	4.6	11 (FL 12_1); 12 (FL 12_2)	Yes	2.0 (1.2 in MacOS, Linux); 2.1 Beta in Linux ROCm; 2.2 possible	Supported	2020	Radeon RX 6800 (XT)
Navi 3x	RDNA 3	6 nm 5 nm	1.4	4.6	11 (FL 12_1); 12 (FL 12_2)	Yes	2.0 (1.2 in MacOS, Linux); 2.1 Beta in Linux ROCm; 2.2 possible	Supported	2022	Radeon RX 7900 XT(X)
Navi 4x	RDNA 4	4 nm	1.4	4.6	11 (FL 12_1); 12 (FL 12_2)	Yes	2.0 (1.2 in MacOS, Linux); 2.1 Beta in Linux ROCm; 2.2 possible	Supported	2025	Radeon RX 9070 (XT)

=== Feature overview ===
The following table shows features of AMD/ATI's GPUs (see also: List of AMD graphics processing units).

Name of GPU series	Wonder	Mach	3D Rage	Rage Pro	Rage 128	R100	R200	R300	R400	R500	R600	RV670	R700	Evergreen	Northern Islands		Southern Islands	Sea Islands	Volcanic Islands	Arctic Islands/Polaris	Vega	Navi 1x	Navi 2x	Navi 3x	Navi 4x
Released	1986	1991	Apr; 1996	Mar; 1997	Aug; 1998	Apr; 2000	Aug; 2001	Sep; 2002	May; 2004	Oct; 2005	May; 2007	Nov; 2007	Jun; 2008	Sep; 2009	Oct; 2010	Dec; 2010	Jan; 2012	Sep; 2013	Jun; 2015	Jun 2016, Apr 2017, Aug 2019	Jun 2017, Feb 2019	Jul; 2019	Nov; 2020	Dec; 2022	Feb; 2025
Marketing Name	Wonder	Mach	3D; Rage	Rage; Pro	Rage; 128	Radeon; 7000	Radeon; 8000	Radeon; 9000	Radeon; X700/X800	Radeon; X1000	Radeon; HD 2000	Radeon; HD 3000	Radeon; HD 4000	Radeon; HD 5000	Radeon; HD 6000		Radeon; HD 7000	Radeon; 200	Radeon; 300	Radeon; 400/500/600	Radeon; RX Vega, Radeon VII	Radeon; RX 5000	Radeon; RX 6000	Radeon; RX 7000	Radeon; RX 9000
AMD support	Ended																			Current					
Kind	2D		3D																						
Instruction set architecture	Not publicly known									Multiple (Note: R500 has two instruction sets. Vertex shader cores: "PVS instruction set". Pixel shader cores: "US instruction set".)	TeraScale instruction set						GCN instruction set					RDNA instruction set			
Microarchitecture	Not publicly known					GFX1		GFX2			TeraScale 1 (VLIW5) (GFX3)			TeraScale 2 (VLIW5) (GFX4)	TeraScale 2 (VLIW5) up to 68xx (GFX4)	TeraScale 3 (VLIW4) in 69xx (GFX5)	GCN 1st gen (GFX6)	GCN 2nd gen (GFX7)	GCN 3rd gen (GFX8)	GCN 4th gen (GFX8)	GCN 5th gen (GFX9)	RDNA (GFX10.1)	RDNA 2 (GFX10.3)	RDNA 3 (GFX11)	RDNA 4 (GFX12)
Type	Fixed pipeline (Note: The Radeon R100 Series has programmable pixel shaders, but do not fully comply with DirectX 8 or Pixel Shader 1.0. See article on R100's pixel shaders.)						Programmable pixel & vertex pipelines				Unified shader model														
Direct3D	—N/a		5.0	6.0		7.0	8.1	9.0; 11 (9_2)	9.0b 11 (9_2)	9.0c 11 (9_3)	10.0; 11 (10_0)	10.1; 11 (10_1)		11 (11_0)			11 (11_1); 12 (11_1)	11 (12_0); 12 (12_0)			11 (12_1); 12 (12_1)		11 (12_1); 12 (12_2)		
Shader model	—N/a						1.4	2.0+	2.0b	3.0	4.0	4.1		5.0			5.1	5.1; 6.5			6.7				6.8
OpenGL	—N/a			1.1	1.2	1.3		1.5 (Note: R300, R400 and R500 based cards do not fully comply with OpenGL 2+ as the hardware does not support all types of non-power of two (NPOT) textures.)			3.3			4.5 (Windows), 4.6 (Linux Mesa 25.2+)			4.6 (Note: OpenGL 4+ compliance requires supporting FP64 shaders and these are emulated on some TeraScale chips using 32-bit hardware.)								
Vulkan	—N/a															1.1 (Note: Vulkan support is theoretically possible but has not been implemented in a stable driver.)	1.3 (Note: Vulkan support in Linux relies on the AMDgpu kernel driver, the radeon driver does not support Vulkan.)		1.4						
OpenCL	—N/a										Close to Metal		1.1 (not supported by Mesa)	1.2+ (on Linux: 1.1+ (no Image support on Clover, with Rusticl) with Mesa, 1.2+ on GCN 1.Gen)				2.0+ (Adrenalin driver on Win 7+) (on Linux ROCm, Mesa 1.2+ (no support in Clover, only Rusticl, Mesa, 2.0+ and 3.0 with AMD drivers or AMD ROCm), 5th gen: 2.2 win 10+ and Linux RocM 5.0+				2.2+ and 3.0 Windows 8.1+ and Linux ROCm 5.0+ (Mesa Rusticl 1.2+ and 3.0 (2.1+ and 2.2+))			
HSA / ROCm	—N/a																Yes					?			
Video decoding ASIC	—N/a										Avivo/UVD	UVD+	UVD 2	UVD 2.2	UVD 3		UVD 4	UVD 4.2	UVD 5.0 or 6.0	UVD 6.3	UVD 7 (Note: The UVD and VCE were replaced by the Video Core Next (VCN) ASIC in the Raven Ridge APU implementation of Vega.)	VCN 2.0	VCN 3.0	VCN 4.0	VCN 5.0
Video encoding ASIC	—N/a																VCE 1.0	VCE 2.0	VCE 3.0 or 3.1	VCE 3.4	VCE 4.0	VCN 2.0	VCN 3.0	VCN 4.0	VCN 5.0
Fluid Motion (Note: Video processing for video frame rate interpolation technique. In Windows it works as a DirectShow filter in your player. In Linux, there is no support on the part of drivers and / or community.)	No																	Yes				No		?	
Power saving	?										PowerPlay				PowerTune		PowerTune & ZeroCore Power					?			
TrueAudio	—N/a																	Via dedicated DSP		Via shaders					
FreeSync	—N/a																	1; 2							
HDCP (Note: To play protected video content, it also requires card, operating system, driver, and application support. A compatible HDCP display is also needed for this. HDCP is mandatory for the output of certain audio formats, placing additional constraints on the multimedia setup.)	—N/a										?							1.4		2.2		2.3			
PlayReady	—N/a																			3.0	No	3.0			
Supported displays (Note: More displays may be supported with native DisplayPort connections, or splitting the maximum resolution between multiple monitors with active converters.)						1–2	2							2–6								?			4
Max. resolution	?													2–6 × 2560×1600			2–6 × 4096×2160 @ 30 Hz			2–6 × 5120×2880 @ 60 Hz	3 × 7680×4320 @ 60 Hz	7680×4320 @ 60 Hz PowerColor		7680x4320 @165 Hz	7680x4320
/drm/radeon (Note: DRM (Direct Rendering Manager) is a component of the Linux kernel. AMDgpu is the Linux kernel module. Support in this table refers to the most current version.)						Yes													—N/a						
/drm/amdgpu	—N/a																Yes Kernel 6.19+		Yes						

== Graphics device drivers ==
=== AMD's proprietary graphics "Radeon Software" (Formerly Catalyst) ===
On 24 November 2015, AMD released a new version of their graphics driver following the formation of the Radeon Technologies Group (RTG) to provide extensive software support for their graphics cards. This driver, labelled Radeon Software Crimson Edition, overhauls the UI with Qt, resulting in better responsiveness from a design and system perspective. It includes a new interface featuring a game manager, clocking tools, and sections for different technologies.

Unofficial modifications such as Omega drivers and DNA drivers were available. These drivers typically consist of mixtures of various driver file versions with some registry variables altered and are advertised as offering superior performance or image quality. They are, of course, unsupported, and as such, are not guaranteed to function correctly. Some of them also provide modified system files for hardware enthusiasts to run specific graphics cards outside of their specifications.

==== On operating systems ====
AMD Catalyst was based on a proprietary binary blob.

The unified kernel-mode driver (DRM/KMS) is utilized by Catalyst and by Mesa 3D. amdkfd was mainlined into Linux kernel 3.19.

Radeon Software is being developed for Microsoft Windows and Linux. As of January 2019, other operating systems are not officially supported. This may be different for the Radeon Pro brand, which is based on identical hardware but features OpenGL-certified graphics device drivers.

For Radeon (except Radeon Pro) product line, AMD does not provide official supports and official drivers for Windows Server operating systems.

ATI previously offered driver updates for their retail and integrated Macintosh video cards and chipsets. ATI stopped support for Mac OS 9 after the Radeon R200 cards, making the last officially supported card the Radeon 9250. The Radeon R100 cards up to the Radeon 7200 can still be used with even older classic Mac OS versions such as System 7, although not all features are taken advantage of by the older operating system.

Ever since ATI's acquisition by AMD, ATI no longer supplies or supports drivers for classic Mac OS nor macOS. macOS drivers can be downloaded from Apple's support website, while classic Mac OS drivers can be obtained from 3rd party websites that host the older drivers for users to download. ATI used to provide a preference panel for use in macOS called ATI Displays which can be used both with retail and OEM versions of its cards. Though it gives more control over advanced features of the graphics chipset, ATI Displays has limited functionality compared to Catalyst for Windows or Linux.

=== Third-party free and open-source "Radeon" ===
The free and open-source for Direct Rendering Infrastructure has been under constant development by the Linux kernel developers, by 3rd party programming enthusiasts and by AMD employees. It is composed out of five parts:

1. Linux kernel component DRM
  - this part received dynamic re-clocking support in Linux kernel version 3.12 and its performance has become comparable to that of AMD Catalyst
2. Linux kernel component KMS driver: basically the device driver for the display controller
3. user-space component libDRM
4. user-space component in Mesa 3D; currently most of these components are written conforming to the Gallium3D-specifications.
  - all drivers in Mesa 3D with Version 10.x (last 10.6.7) are as of September 2014 limited to OpenGL version 3.3 and OpenGL ES 3.0.
  - all drivers in Mesa 3D with Version 11.x (last 11.2.2) are as of Mai 2016 limited to OpenGL version 4.1 and OpenGL ES 3.0 or 3.1 (11.2+).
  - all drivers in Mesa 3D with version 12.x (in June 2016) can support OpenGL version 4.3.
  - all drivers in Mesa 3D with Version 13.0.x ( in November 2016) can support OpenGL 4.4 and unofficial 4.5.
  - all drivers in Mesa 3D with Version 17.0.x ( in January 2017) can support OpenGL 4.5 and OpenGL ES 3.2
  - Actual Hardware Support for different MESA versions see: glxinfo
  - AMD R600/700 since Mesa 10.1: OpenGL 3.3+, OpenGL ES 3.0+ (+: some more Features of higher Levels and Mesa Version)
  - AMD R800/900 (Evergreen, Northern Islands): OpenGL 4.1+ (Mesa 13.0+), OpenGL ES 3.0+ (Mesa 10.3+)
  - AMD GCN (Southern/Sea Islands and newer): OpenGL 4.5+ (Mesa 17.0+), OpenGL ES 3.2+ (Mesa 18.0+), Vulkan 1.0 (Mesa 17.0+), Vulkan 1.1 (GCN 2nd Gen+, Mesa 18.1+)
5. a special and distinct 2D graphics device driver for X.Org Server, which is finally about to be replaced by Glamor
6. OpenCL with GalliumCompute (previous Clover) is not full developed in 1.0, 1.1 and only parts of 1.2. Some OpenCL conformance tests were failed in 1.0 and 1.1, most in 1.2. ROCm is developed by AMD and Open Source. OpenCL 1.2 is full supported with OpenCL 2.0 language. Only CPU or GCN-Hardware with PCIe 3.0 is supported. So GCN 3rd Gen. or higher is here full usable for OpenCL 1.2 software.

==== Supported features ====
The free and open-source driver supports many of the features available in Radeon-branded cards and APUs, such as multi-monitor or hybrid graphics.

==== Linux ====
The free and open-source drivers are primarily developed on Linux and for Linux.

==== Other operating systems ====
Being entirely free and open-source software, the free and open-source drivers can be ported to any existing operating system. Whether they have been, and to what extent depends entirely on the man-power available. Available support shall be referenced here.

FreeBSD adopted DRI, and since Mesa 3D is not programmed for Linux, it should have identical support.

MorphOS supports 2D and 3D acceleration for Radeon R100, R200 and R300 chipsets.

AmigaOS 4 supports Radeon R100, R200, R300, R520 (X1000 series), R700 (HD 4000 series), HD 5000 (Evergreen) series, HD 6000 (Northern Islands) series and HD 7000 (Southern Islands) series. The RadeonHD AmigaOS 4 driver has been developed by Hans de Ruiter funded and owned by A-EON Technology Ltd. The older R100 and R200 "ATIRadeon" driver for AmigaOS, originally developed Forefront Technologies has been acquired by A-EON Technology Ltd in 2015.

In the past ATI provided hardware and technical documentation to the Haiku Project to produce drivers with full 2D and video in/out support on older Radeon chipsets (up to R500) for Haiku. A new Radeon HD driver was developed with the unofficial and indirect guidance of AMD open source engineers and currently exists in recent Haiku versions. The new Radeon HD driver supports native mode setting on R600 through Southern Islands GPU's.

==== Driver vulnerabilities ====
Current drivers are affected by LeftoverLocals vulnerability referenced as GPU Memory Leaks by AMD. This was supposed to be fixed at 2024 Q1 but it has been postponed several times and the current plan for desktop CPUs containing Radeon GPU and GPUs mitigation is set for 2025 Q2 leaving customers exposed to it for more than year. Other vendors facing this vulnerability such as Qualcom fixed this issue within a month.

== Embedded GPU products ==
AMD (and its predecessor ATI) have released a series of embedded GPUs targeted toward medical, entertainment, and display devices.

Model	Released	Shaders (Compute Units)	FP power Single Precision	Memory	Memory band-with	Memory clock	OpenGL Version	OpenCL Version	DirectX Version	Vulkan	UVD	Power	Output
E9550 (Polaris, GCN 4)	2016-09-27	2304 (36 CU)	5834 GFLOPS	8 GB GDDR5	256 Bit	2000 MHz	4.5	2.0	12	1.1	6.3	95 Watt	MXM-B
E9260 (GCN 4)	2016-09-27	896 (14 CU)	2150 GFLOPS	4 GB GDDR5	128 Bit	1750 MHz	4.5	2.0	12	1.1	6.3	50 W	PCIe 3.0, MXM-A
E9171 MCM (GCN 4)	2017-10-03	512 (8 CU)	1248 GFLOPS	4 GB GDDR5	128 Bit	1500 MHz	4.5	2.0	12	1.1	6.3	40 W	PCIe 3.0 x8
E9172 MXM (GCN 4)	2017-10-03	512 (8 CU)	1248 GFLOPS	2 GB GDDR5	64 Bit	1500 MHz	4.5	2.0	12	1.1	6.3	35 W	MXM-A 3.0
E9173 PCIe (GCN 4)	2017-10-03	512 (8 CU)	1248 GFLOPS	2 GB GDDR5	64 Bit	1500 MHz	4.5	2.0	12	1.1	6.3	35 W	PCIe 3.0 x8
E9174 MXM (GCN 4)	2017-10-03	512 (8 CU)	1248 GFLOPS	4 GB GDDR5	128 Bit	1500 MHz	4.5	2.0	12	1.1	6.3	50 W	MXM-A 3.0
E9175 PCIe (GCN 4)	2017-10-03	512 (8 CU)	1248 GFLOPS	4 GB GDDR5	128 Bit	1500 MHz	4.5	2.0	12	1.1	6.3	50 W	PCIe 3.0 x8
E8950 (GCN 3)	2015-09-29	2048 (32 CU)	3010 GFLOPS	8 GB GDDR5	128 Bit	1500 MHz	4.5	2.0	12	1.1	4.2	95 W	MXM-B
E8870 (GCN 2)	2015-09-29	768 (12 CU)	1536 GFLOPS	4 GB GDDR5	128 Bit	1500 MHz	4.5	2.0	12	1.1	4.2	75 W	PCIe 3.0, MXM-B
E8860 (GCN 1)	2014-01-25	640 (10 CU)	800 GFLOPS	2 GB GDDR5	128 Bit	1125 MHz	4.5	1.2	12.0	1.0	3.1	37 W	PCIe 3.0, MXM-B
E6760 (Turks)	2011-05-02	480 (6 CU)	576 GFLOPS	1 GB GDDR5	128 Bit	800 MHz	4.3	1.2	11	N/A	3.0	35 W	PCIe 2.1, MXM-A, MCM
E6465 (Caicos)	2015-09-29	160 (2 CU)	192 GFLOPS	2 GB GDDR5	64 Bit	800 MHz	4.5	1.2	11.1	N/A	3.0	< 20 W	PCIe 2.1, MXM-A, MCM
E6460 (Caicos)	2011-04-07	160 (2 CU)	192 GFLOPS	512 MB GDDR5	64 Bit	800 MHz	4.5	1.2	11.1	N/A	3.0	16 W	PCIe 2.1, MXM-A, MCM
E4690 (RV730)	2009-06-01	320 (4 CU)	388 GFLOPS	512 MB GDDR3	128 Bit	700 MHz	3.3	1.0	10.1	N/A	2.2	30 W	MXM-II
E2400 (RV610)	2006-07-28	40 (2 CU)	48 GFLOPS	128 MB GDDR3	64 Bit	700 MHz	3.3	ATI Stream	10.0	N/A	1.0	25 W	MXM-II

== Radeon Memory ==
In August 2011, AMD expanded the Radeon name to include random access memory modules under the AMD Memory line. The initial releases included 3 types of 2GiB DDR3 SDRAM modules: Entertainment (1333 MHz, CL9 9-9), UltraPro Gaming (1600 MHz, CL11 11-11) and Enterprise (specs to be determined).

On 8 May 2013, AMD announced the release of Radeon RG2133 Gamer Series Memory.

Radeon R9 2400 Gamer Series Memory was released on 16 January 2014.

=== Production ===
Dataram Corporation is manufacturing RAM for AMD.

== Radeon RAMDisk ==
On 6 September 2012, Dataram Corporation announced it has entered into a formal agreement with AMD to develop an AMD-branded version of Dataram's RAMDisk software under the name Radeon RAMDisk, targeting gaming enthusiasts seeking exponential improvements in game load times leading to an enhanced gaming experience. The freeware version of Radeon RAMDisk software supports Windows Vista and later with minimum 4GiB memory, and supports maximum of 4GiB RAM disk (6GiB if AMD Radeon Value, Entertainment, Performance Edition or Products installed, and Radeon RAMDisk is activated between 2012-10-10 and 2013-10-10). Retail version supports RAM disk size between 5MiB to 64GiB.

=== Version history ===
Version 4.1 was released on 8 May 2013.

=== Production ===
In 2014-04-02, Dataram Corporation announced it has signed an Agreement with Elysium Europe Ltd. to expand sales penetration in Europe, the Middle East and Africa. Under this Agreement, Elysium is authorized to sell AMD Radeon RAMDisk software. Elysium is focusing on etailers, retailers, system builders and distributors.

== Radeon SSD ==
AMD planned to enter solid state drive market with the introduction of R7 models powered by Indilinx Barefoot 3 controller and Toshiba 19 nm MLC flash memory, and initially available in 120G, 240G, 480G capacities. The R7 Series SSD was released on 9 August 2014, which included Toshiba's A19 MLC NAND flash memory, Indilinx Barefoot 3 M00 controller. These components are the same as in the SSD OCZ Vector 150 model.

== See also ==
- AMD FirePro – brand for professional product line based on Radeon GPUs up to the AMD Radeon Rx 300 series
- AMD Radeon Pro – successor to FirePro and launched alongside the AMD Radeon 400 series
- AMD FireStream – brand for stream processing and GPGPU based on Radeon GPUs
- AMD Instinct – successor to FireStream
- AMD FireMV – brand for multi-monitor product line based on Radeon GPUs
