= Hightech Information System =

Hong Kong graphics card manufacturer

HIS Hightech Information System Limited
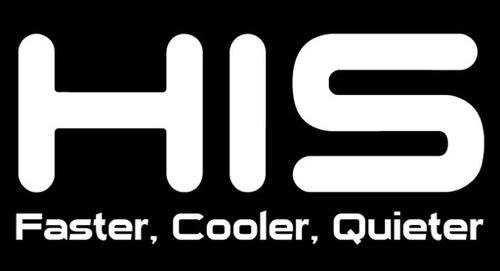
- Company type: Private company limited by shares
- Industry: Computer graphics
- Founded: 1987; 39 years ago
- Headquarters: Hong Kong
- Products: Desktop graphics cards Graphics processing units
- Website: HISdigital.com

HIS (Hightech Information System Limited; established 1987) is a Hong Kong–based graphics card manufacturer that produces AMD (formerly known as ATI) Radeon graphics cards. Its headquarters are in Hong Kong, with additional sales offices and distribution networks in Europe, the Middle East, North America and Asia Pacific regions. The current distributor in Hong Kong is JunMax Technology.

== Products ==
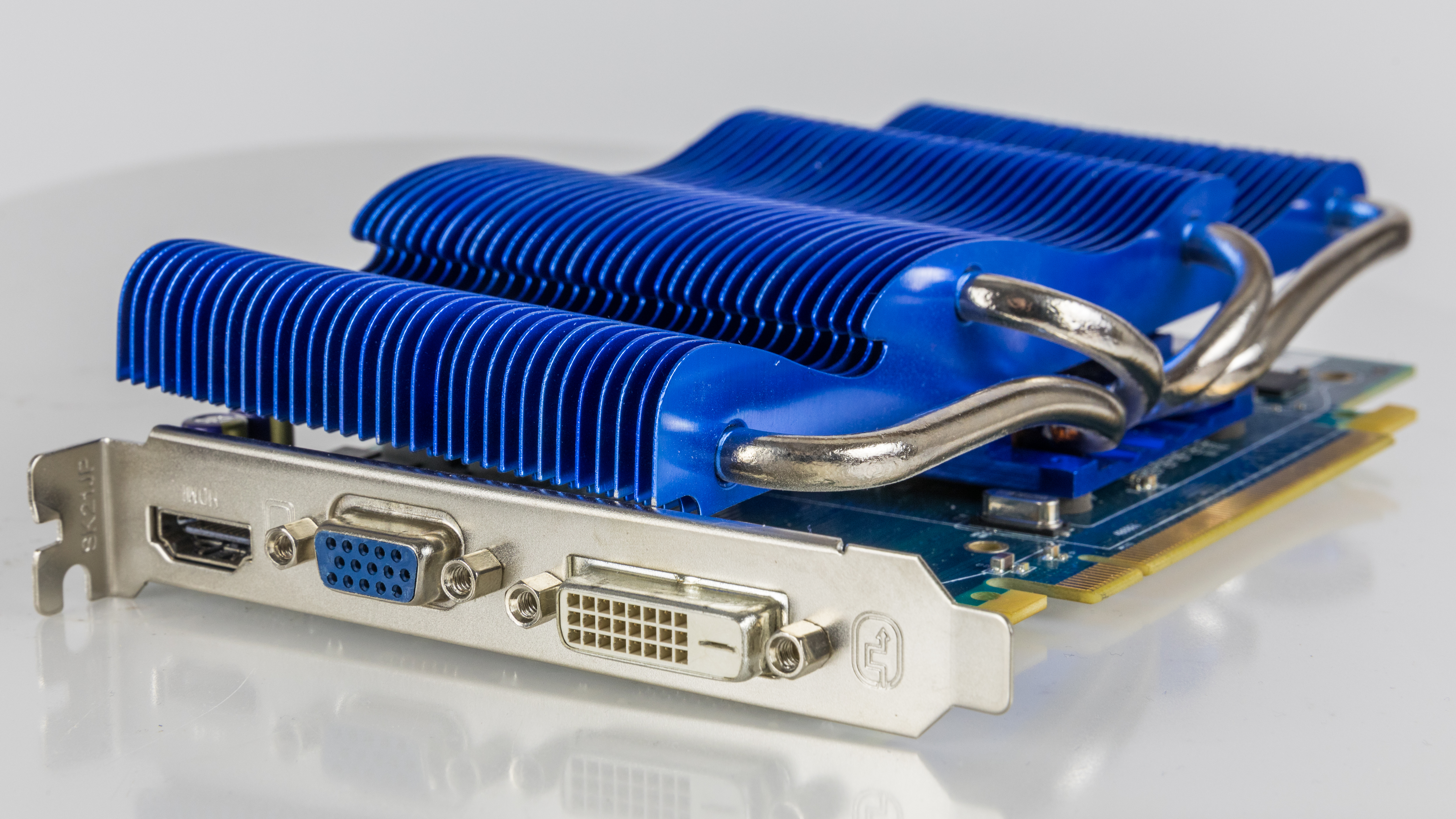
HIS 6670 iSilence 5

HIS manufactures and sells AMD Radeon series video cards. They are known for their IceQ cooling technology as well as producing the latest and fastest PCIe cards like AMD Radeon RX 590, RX 5700 and RX 5700 XT.

In 2019, HIS launched new versions of the RX 5700 XT in pink and blue.
