= Voodoo 5 =

Graphics card line

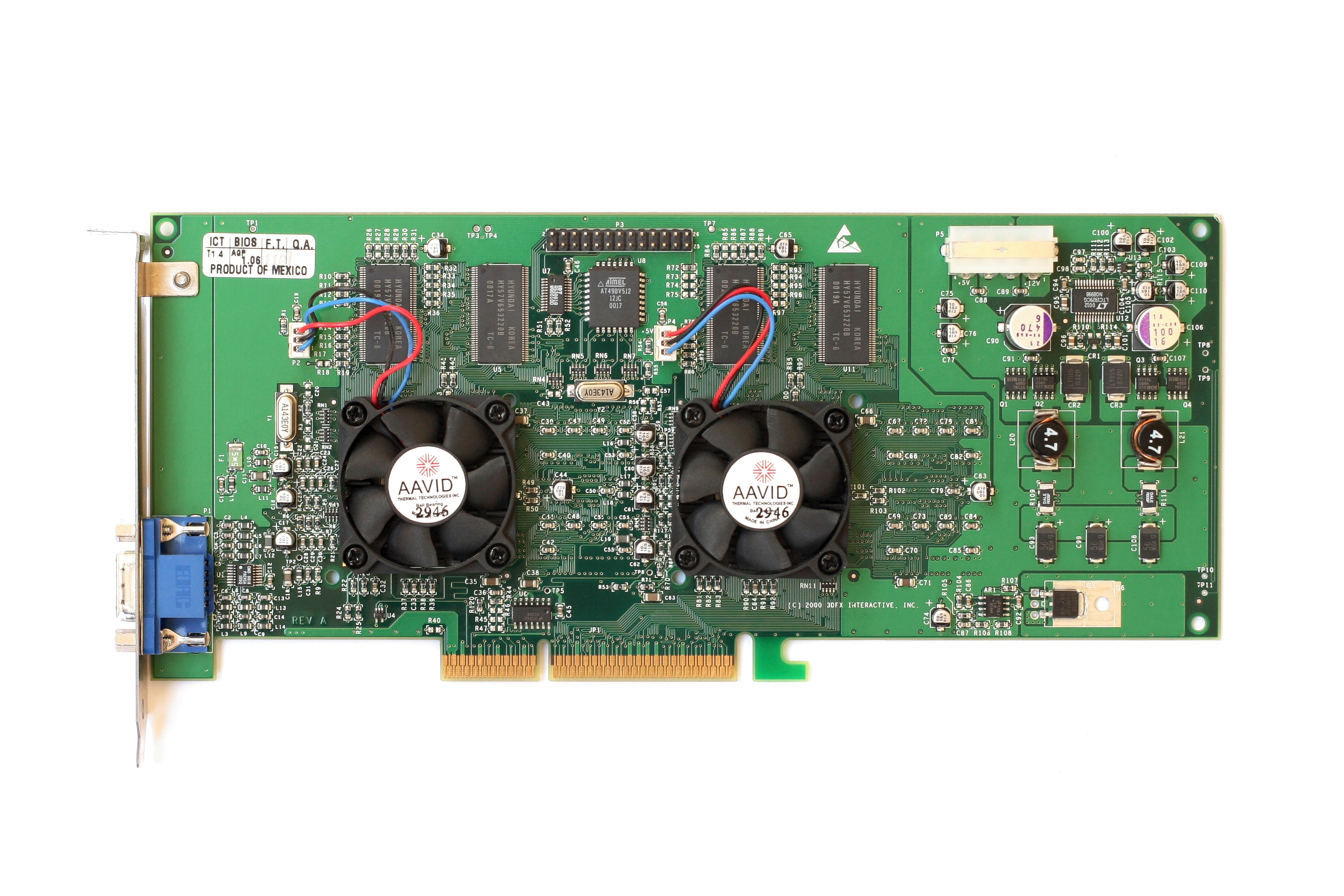
- 3dfx Voodoo5 5500 AGP
- Release date: June 22, 2000; 26 years ago
- Codename: VSA-100

Cards
- Entry-level: Voodoo4 4500
- Mid-range: Voodoo5 5500
- Direct3D: Direct3D 6.0

History
- Predecessor: Voodoo3

Support status
- Unsupported

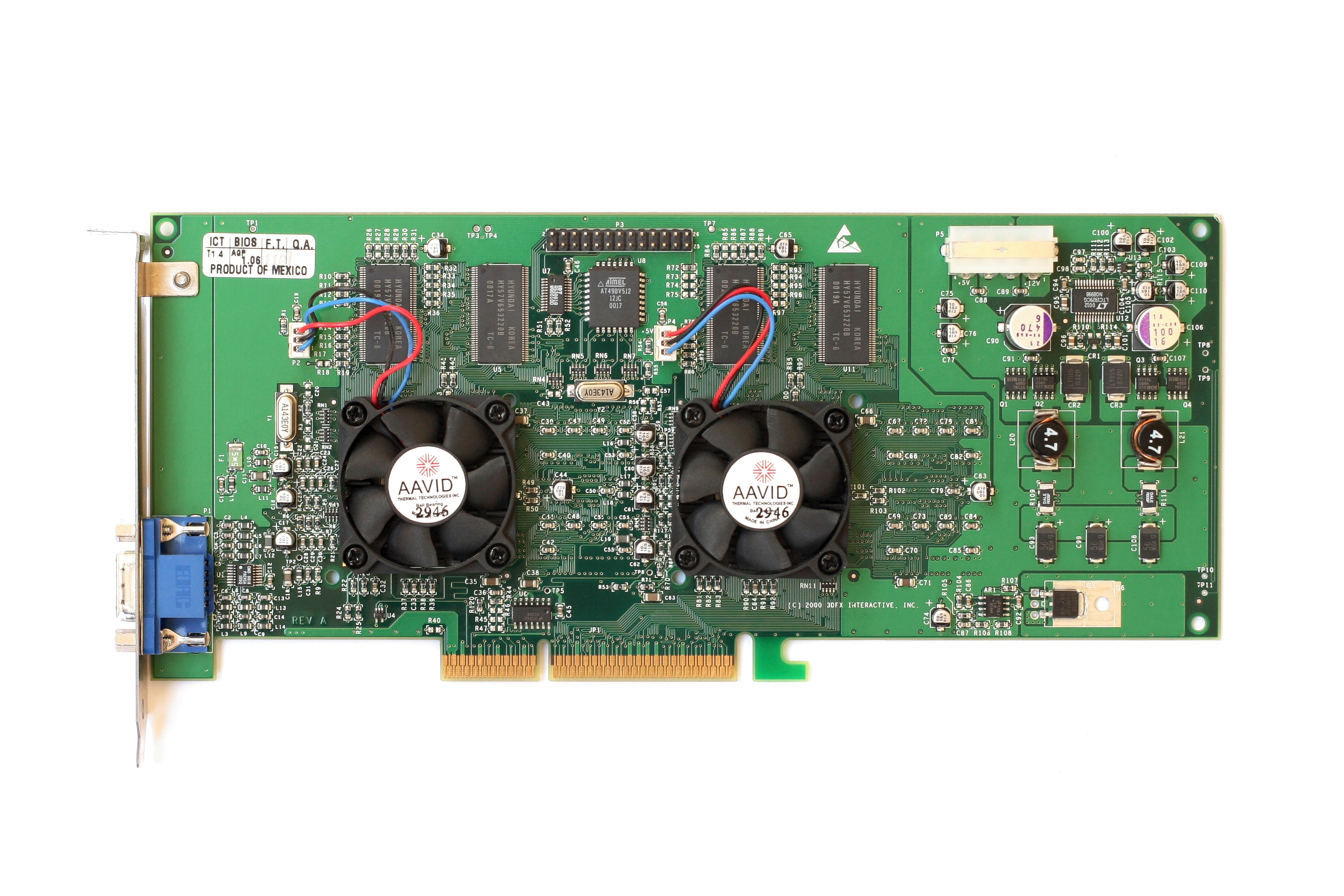
3dfx Voodoo5 5500 AGP

The Voodoo 5 was the last and most powerful graphics card line that was released by 3dfx Interactive. All members of the family were based upon the VSA-100 graphics processor. Only the single-chip Voodoo 4 4500 and dual-chip Voodoo 5 5500 made it to market.

== Architecture and performance ==
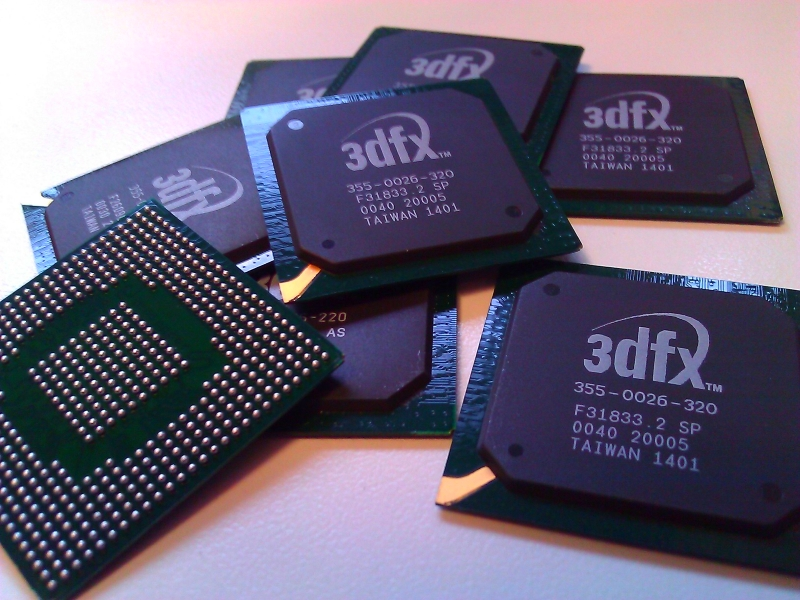
VSA-100 ICs, revision 220 and 320 shown

The VSA-100 graphics chip is a direct descendant of "Avenger", more commonly known as Voodoo3. It was built on a 250 nm semiconductor manufacturing process, as with Voodoo3. However, the process was tweaked with a sixth metal layer to allow for better density and speed, and the transistors have a slightly shorter gate length and thinner gate oxide. VSA-100 has a transistor count of roughly 14 million, compared to Voodoo3's ~8 million. The chip has a larger texture cache than its predecessors and the data paths are 32 bits wide rather than 16-bit. Rendering calculations are 40 bits wide in VSA-100 but the operands and results are stored as 32-bit.

One of the design goals for the VSA-100 was scalability. The name of the chip is an abbreviation for "Voodoo Scalable Architecture." By using one or more VSA-100 chips on a board, the various market segments for graphics cards are satisfied with just a single graphics chip design. Theoretically, anywhere from 1 to 32 VSA-100 GPUs could be run in parallel on a single graphics card, and the fillrate of the card would increase proportionally. On cards with more than one VSA-100, the chips are linked using 3dfx's Scan-Line Interleave (SLI) technology. A major drawback to this method of performance scaling is that various parts of hardware are needlessly duplicated on the cards and board complexity increases with each additional processor.

3dfx changed the rendering pipeline from one pixel pipeline with twin texture mapping units (Voodoo2/3) to a dual pixel pipeline design with one texture mapping unit on each. This design, commonly referred to as a 2×1 configuration, has an advantage over the prior 1×2 design with the ability to always output 2 pixels and 2 texels per clock instead of 1 pixel and 2 texels per clock.

This is the first 3dfx graphics chip to support full 32-bit color depth in 3D, compared to 16-bit color depth with all previous designs. The limitation of 256px × 256px maximum texture dimensions was also addressed and VSA-100 can use up to 2048px × 2048px textures. Additionally, 3dfx implemented the FXT1 and DXTC texture compression techniques.

The VSA-100 supports a hardware accumulation buffer, known as the "T-buffer". When rendering to the T-buffer, VSA-100 can store the combined outputs of several frames. This mechanism allows for creation of effects such as motion blur (if used temporally) and anti-aliasing (if used spatially). VSA-100 supports rotated-grid super-sampling anti-aliasing (RGSS AA) modes, with a maximum anti-aliasing level determined by the number of VSA-100 chips in the SLI configuration. One chip allows 2× AA, two chips allows 4× AA, four chips provides for 8× AA and so on. The RGSS method of anti-aliasing combines multiple samples of each frame, resulting in higher quality than the brute force ordered-grid over-sampling of ImgTech PowerVR, ATI Radeon DDR and Nvidia GeForce 2.

The chip implements a 128-bit SDRAM interface, again similar to the Voodoo3. Memory capacity and bandwidth is separately dedicated to each VSA-100 processor. While capacity is not cumulative across the entire card, bandwidth is effectively cumulative and thus a card with 2× VSA-100 processors has similar bandwidth to a single-chip graphics card using 128-bit DDR memory. Memory is clocked synchronously with the VSA-100 chip. Later, unreleased boards were planned to offer a 64-bit DDR memory design instead, in order to reduce board costs through lower complexity, while offering similar RAM performance.

Voodoo 4 and Voodoo 5 support MPEG-2 video acceleration.

While VSA-100 is an AGP 4× capable graphics processor, 3dfx did not implement AGP texturing.

The Voodoo5 did not offer next-generation DirectX 8.0 vertex and pixel shaders that would be found in the GeForce 3 and Radeon 8500, nor even DirectX 7 features such as hardware transform and lighting acceleration for vertices (although T&L could be compensated by a fast CPU). Designed for scalability, it was nonetheless unrealistic for 3dfx to incrementally increase the number of Voodoo5 chips just to keep pace in performance with rival developments. Nvidia would further refine the GeForce 3's feature set into the GeForce 4 Ti (NV25) to satisfy multiple market segments (the Ti 4600 at $399 and Ti 4200 at $199), as did ATI which derived the lower-cost Radeon 9000 (RV200) from the Radeon 8500 (R200).

== Models ==
=== Voodoo 4 4500 ===
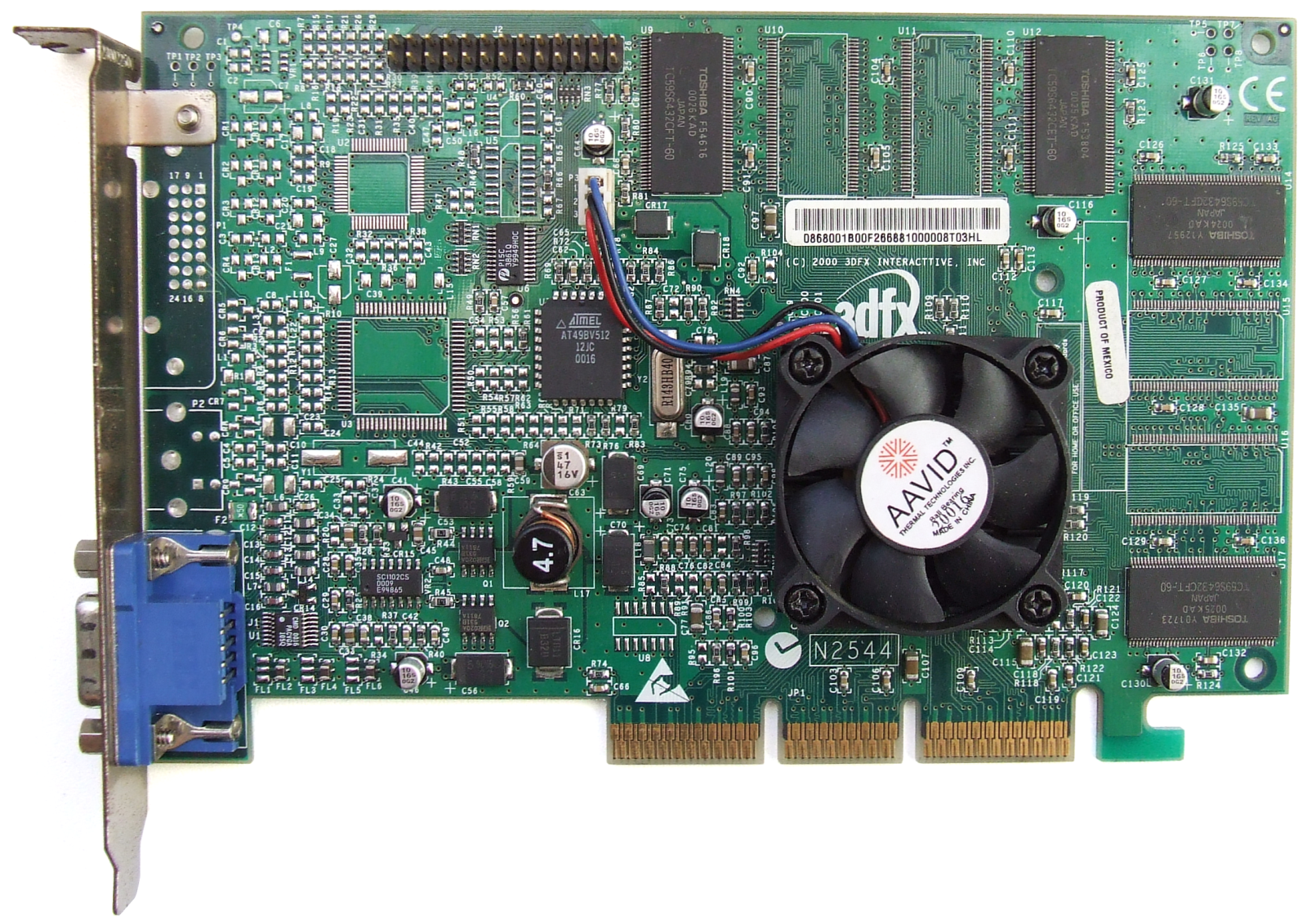
3dfx Voodoo4 4500 AGP

Released after the Voodoo 5 5500, the Voodoo4 4500 is the budget implementation of the VSA-100 product. It used only one VSA-100 chip and did not need an additional power connection. It was more expensive yet it was beaten in almost all areas by the GeForce2 MX and Radeon SDR.

=== Voodoo 5 5000 ===
The unreleased Voodoo 5 5000 was to be similar to the 5500 but with half of the RAM capacity (32 MB total).

=== Voodoo 5 5500 ===
The Voodoo 5 5500 comes in three flavors: a universal AGP version (AGP 1/2x, prototypes were made with AGP4x-interface) with full sideband support, PCI, and the Mac Edition, which is only available for PCI, though could run in 66 MHz PCI slots. The Mac Edition has dual link DVI-D and VGA-A outputs, the other versions just have one VGA-out.

In games, the Voodoo 5 5500 is able to outperform the Nvidia GeForce 256 and ATI Rage 128 MAXX, but was late to market and up against the new GeForce 2 GTS and Radeon DDR, both of which easily outperformed it.

=== Voodoo 5 6000 ===
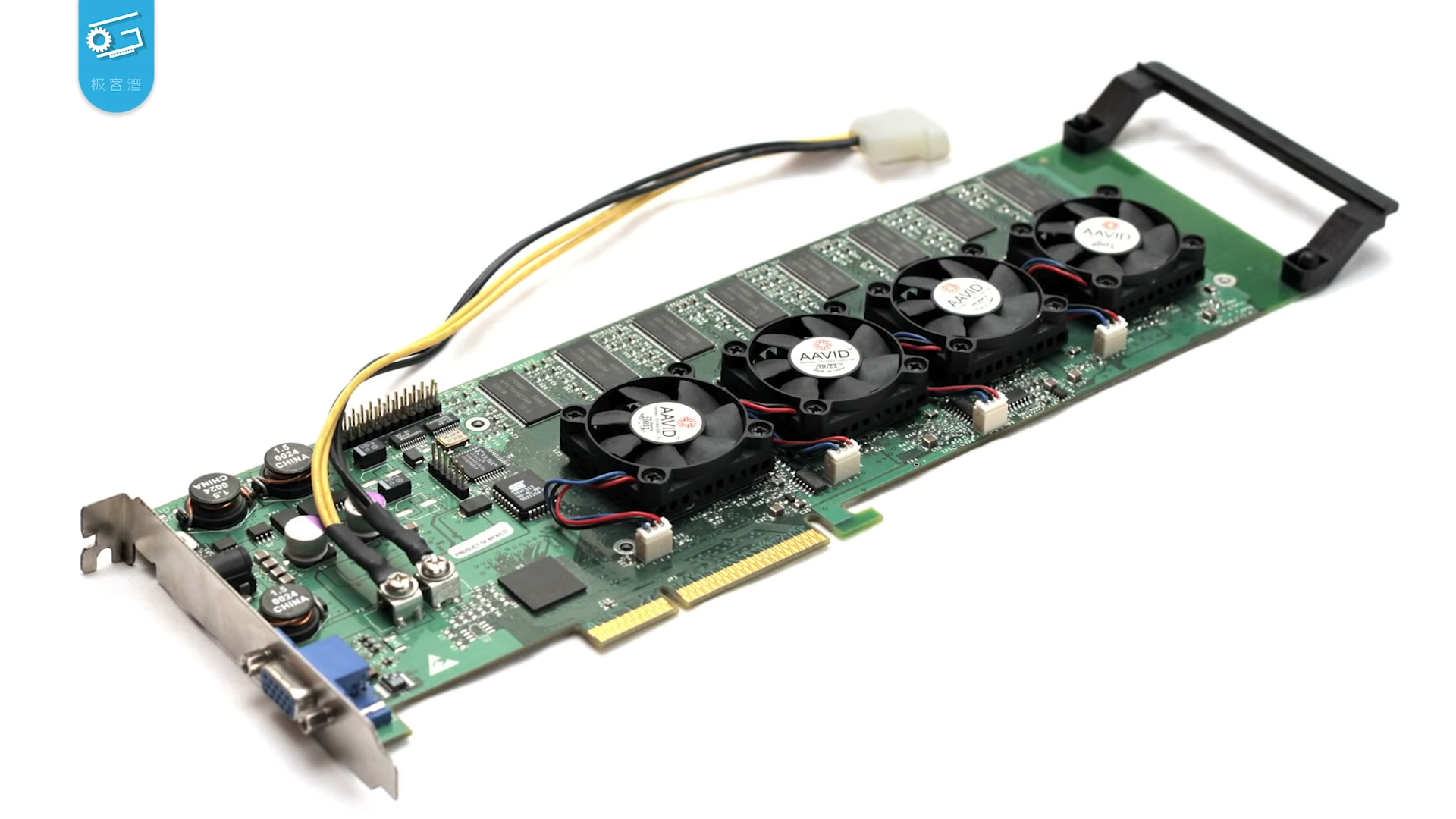
Voodoo 5 6000 Prototype

The Voodoo 5 6000 is the unreleased high-end product in the Voodoo5 line. It was to use four 166 MHz VSA-100 processors, each with its own 32 MB of 166 MHz SDRAM, resulting in the first 128 MB graphics card (consisting of sixteen 8 MB chips). Approximately 1000+ test cards were produced. Because the card used more power than the AGP specification allowed for, a special power supply called Voodoo Volts had to be included with it. This would have been an external device that would connect to an AC outlet. Most of the prototype cards utilized a standard internal power supply Molex power connector.

With regards to performance, little was known until enthusiasts were able to get pre-release hardware and run tests on it. The results showed that the Voodoo 5 6000 outperformed the GeForce 2 Ultra and Radeon 7500, which were the fastest iterations of the GeForce 2 (NV15) and Radeon R100 lines, respectively. (It was rumored that GeForce 2 Ultra was intended to prevent 3dfx taking the lead with their Voodoo 5 6000.) In some cases, the 6000 was shown to compete well with the next-generation GeForce 3.

The precarious financial situation of 3dfx was a factor contributing to the 6000's demise. But even had 3dfx survived long enough to launch the Voodoo5 6000, the production cost would have likely hampered its competitiveness from a profitability standpoint. Due to being burdened with much redundancy and a complicated board, particularly 128MB of RAM, it was projected to have a US$600 price tag, considerably higher than the single-chip GeForce 3 (which was intended by Nvidia to replace the short-lived GeForce 2 Ultra as its flagship product) and Radeon 8500 (US$299) which achieved similar performance in their debut releases with 64MB (although 128 MB versions were later made available). The Voodoo5 6000's omissions would be apparent for its price, since it did not have next-generation DirectX 8.0 vertex and pixel shaders that would be found in the GeForce 3 and Radeon 8500.

There were five revisions of the Voodoo 5 6000: (the numbers after the model state the build week: 10 for week 10, 00 for year 2000).

==== Intel Revision 1 (model 1000–1900) ====
This was an early alpha of the card primarily used for photos and testing purposes. These cards generally had a short life expectancy, and were largely incompatible with various motherboards at the time. They also typically could not achieve speeds above 143 MHz without suffering from VSA-100 "death". This revision used an Intel PCI bridge chip, was equipped with 128 MB of 5.4ns SDRAM and used a proprietary external 3dfx power supply. Initial models had the chips mounted in the arrangement seen in the photograph, but this required a PCB with eight circuitry layers (most GeForce 2 cards were four-layer, while the Voodoo 5 5500 was six-layer) and would have been unreasonably expensive. All of the later revisions had the four chips mounted in a row.

==== HiNT Revision 2 (model 2000–2900) ====
This version dropped the Intel PCI bridge chip in favor of a HiNT bridge chip. These cards were able to be powered by either the internal system PSU or by a proprietary 3dfx external power supply, a feature seen in all subsequent prototype revisions. The clock speed varied from card to card, generally either 166 or 183 MHz. The VSA-100 chips used still did not have a long life expectancy, and may have had problems running anti-aliasing. This revision had 128 MB of 5.0ns SDRAM.

==== HiNT Revision 3 (model 3000–3500) ====
Cards from this revision varied in stability from dead to fully functional. A lot of problems had been fixed in this revision, but it still had VSA-100 thermal death problems above 183 MHz. These cards either had 166 or 183 MHz VSA-100 GPUs.

==== HiNT Revision 4 (3600–3700) ====
3dfx decided on 166 MHz due to issues with the 6000 running properly at 183 MHz due to a design flaw with the PCB. Most of the problems seen in earlier revisions were fixed, although there may have been glitches while in anti-aliasing mode on some cards. Most of the known cards are revision A from week 37, 2000.

==== HiNT Revision 5 (model 3900) ====
Little is known about this series except that this is the final revision. It was meant to be the retail unit, but shortly after the run of 10 were produced, the 6000 series was cancelled.

=== List ===
Model	Launch	VGA^{1}	Code name	Fab	Bus interface		Clock (MHz)		Core config^{2}	Fillrate				Memory				Direct3D support
Model	Launch	VGA^{1}	Code name	Fab	Bus interface		Clock (MHz)		Core config^{2}	MOps/s	MPixels/s	MTexels/s	MVertices/s	Size (MiB)	Bandwidth (GB/s)	Bus type	Bus width (bit)	Direct3D support
Model	Launch	VGA^{1}	Code name	Fab	PCI	AGP	Memory	Core	Core config^{2}	MOps/s	MPixels/s	MTexels/s	MVertices/s	Size (MiB)	Bandwidth (GB/s)	Bus type	Bus width (bit)	Direct3D support
Voodoo4 4000	Never released	✓	VSA-100	250 nm	✓	4×	166	166	2:2	333	333	333	0	16	2.66	SDR	128	6.0
Voodoo4-2 4000	Never released	✓	VSA-101	180 nm		✓	?	?	2:2	?	?	?	0	16	?	SDR	?	6.0
Voodoo4-2 4200	Never released	✓	VSA-101	180 nm	✓	✓	143	143	2:2	286	286	286	0	16/32	2.29	DDR	64	6.0
Voodoo4-2 4200	Never released	✓	VSA-101	180 nm	✓		166	166	2:2	333	333	333	0	32	2.66	DDR	64	6.0
Voodoo4 4500	Oct. 13, 2000	✓	VSA-100	250 nm	✓	2/4×	166	166	2:2	333	333	333	0	32	2.66	SDR	128	6.0
Voodoo4 4800	Never released	✓	VSA-100	250 nm	✓	4×	166	166	2:2	333	333	333	0	64	2.66	SDR	128	6.0
Voodoo5 5000	Never released	✓	VSA-100 ×2	250 nm	✓	4×	166	166	2:2 ×2	667	667	667	0	32	5.33	SDR	128 ×2	6.0
Voodoo5 5500	June 22, 2000	✓	VSA-100 ×2	250 nm	✓	2×	166	166	2:2 ×2	667	667	667	0	64	5.33	SDR	128 ×2	6.0
Voodoo5 6000	Never released	✓	VSA-100 ×4	250 nm	✓	4×	166	166	2:2 ×4	1333	1333	1333	0	128	10.66	SDR	128 ×4	6.0

- ^{1} VGA: Whether the card included a built-in VGA subsystem and ran as a standalone graphics card
- ^{2} Texture mapping units:render output units

== Successor ==
The successor to the Voodoo 5 series, codenamed "Rampage", was already planned and had been in development for years. It was supposed to have a smaller semiconductor device fabrication process, support for DDR SDRAM, 200+ MHz core, and a T&L unit. However, it was early in its development and only approximately twenty working cards were produced before 3dfx went bankrupt, and most assets were purchased by Nvidia in late 2000.

== Competing chipsets ==
- ATI Rage 128 MAXX and Radeon
- Nvidia GeForce 256 and GeForce2
- PowerVR Series 3 (Kyro and Kyro II)
- S3 Savage 2000
- Matrox Millennium G400 MAX
