= RDNA 4 =

GPU microarchitecture by AMD

- Launched: February 28, 2025; 20 months ago
- Designed by: AMD
- Manufactured by: TSMC
- Fabrication process: TSMC N4P

Product series
- Desktop: Radeon RX 9000 series
- Professional/workstation: Radeon AI Pro R9000 series

Specifications
- Compute: Up to 48.7 TFLOPS (FP16); Up to 48.7 TFLOPS (FP32); Up to 0.76 TFLOPS (FP64)
- Clock rate: 1700 MHz to 2530 MHz
- L0 cache: 64 KB (per WGP)
- L1 cache: 128 KB (per array)
- L2 cache: 8 MB
- L3 cache: 64 MB
- Memory support: GDDR6
- Memory clock rate: up to 20 Gbps
- PCIe support: PCIe 5.0

Supported graphics APIs
- Direct3D: Direct3D 12.0 Ultimate (feature level 12_2)
- Shader model: Shader Model 6.7
- OpenGL: OpenGL 4.6
- Vulkan: Vulkan 1.4

Supported compute APIs
- OpenCL: OpenCL 2.1

Media engine
- Encode codecs: H.264; H.265; AV1
- Decode codecs: H.264; H.265; AV1
- Color bit-depth: 8-bit; 10-bit; 12-bit
- Encoders supported: AMF; VCE
- Display outputs: DisplayPort 2.1; HDMI 2.1a; USB-C

History
- Predecessor: RDNA 3

Support status
- Supported

RDNA 4 is a GPU microarchitecture designed by AMD, released with the Radeon RX 9000 series on February 28, 2025.

== Architecture ==
=== Packaging ===
Unlike its predecessor RDNA 3, AMD went back to monolithic dies with RDNA 4.

=== Ray tracing ===
RDNA 4 features the third generation of the ray tracing accelerator, doubling the number of ray-box and ray-triangle intersections and adding several performance improvements.

== Navi 4x dies ==
			Navi 44	Navi 48
Launch			Jun 2025	Mar 2025
Compute units (Stream processors) [FP32 cores]			32 (2048) [4096]	64 (4096) [8192]
VCN 5.0 Unit(s)			1	2
Process			TSMC N4P	
Transistors			Up to 29.7 bn.	Up to 53.9 bn.
Transistor density			149.2 MTr/mm^{2}	151.1 MTr/mm^{2}
Die size			199 mm^{2}	356.5 mm^{2}
Products	Consumer	Desktop	RX 9060 XT; RX 9060; RX 9050	RX 9070 XT; RX 9070 GRE; RX 9070
Products	Consumer	Mobile	—N/a	—N/a
Products	Workstation	Desktop	—N/a	AI Pro R9700; AI Pro R9700S; AI Pro R9600; AI Pro R9600D
Products	Workstation	Mobile	—N/a	—N/a

== Products ==
=== Gaming ===
==== Desktop ====
Model (Code name)	Release date & price	Architecture & fab	Transistors & die size	Core		Fillrate (Note: Boost values (if available) are stated below the base value in italic.) (Note: Texture fillrate is calculated as the number of Texture Mapping Units multiplied by the base (or boost) core clock speed.) (Note: Pixel fillrate is calculated as the number of Render Output Units multiplied by the base (or boost) core clock speed.)		Processing power					Infinity Cache		Memory				TBP	Bus interface
Model (Code name)	Release date & price	Architecture & fab	Transistors & die size	Core		Fillrate		TFLOPS (Note: Precision performance is calculated from the base (or boost) core clock speed based on a FMA operation.)			AI TOPS (Note: Officially declared performance is twice the one shown here due to the use of sparsity.)		Infinity Cache		Memory				TBP	Bus interface
Model (Code name)	Release date & price	Architecture & fab	Transistors & die size	Config (Note: Unified shaders : Texture mapping units : Render output units : Ray accelerators : AI accelerators and Compute units (CU))	Clock (MHz)	Texture (GT/s)	Pixel (GP/s)	Half (Note: Formerly officially declared performance is twice the one shown here due to the use of a different operation (a×b+c×d+e).)	Single	Double	INT8	INT4	Size	Bandwidth (GB/s)	Size	Bandwidth (GB/s)	Bus type & width	Clock (MT/s)	TBP	Bus interface
Radeon RX 9050 (Navi 44)	Jul 28, 2026 (APAC/JP/LATAM) $279 USD	RDNA 4 TSMC N4P	29.7 billion 199 mm^{2}	1024:64:64:16:32; 16 CU	1920; 2600	? 166.4	? 166.4	? 10.56	? 10.56	? 0.166	? 85	? 170	16 MB; 32 MB		4 GB; 8 GB	144; 288	GDDR6 64-bit GDDR6 128-bit	18000	92 W	PCIe 5.0 ×16
Radeon RX 9060 (Navi 44)	Aug 5, 2025; OEM	RDNA 4 TSMC N4P	29.7 billion 199 mm^{2}	1792:112:64:28:56; 28 CU	1700; 2990	190.4; 334.9	108.8; 191.4	12.19; 21.43	12.19; 21.43	0.190; 0.335	97; 171	195; 343	32 MB		8 GB	288	GDDR6 128-Bit	18000	132 W	PCIe 5.0 ×16
Radeon RX 9060 XT (Navi 44)	Jun 5, 2025 $299 USD (8 GB) $349 USD (16 GB)	RDNA 4 TSMC N4P	29.7 billion 199 mm^{2}	2048:128:64:32:64; 32 CU	2530; 3130	323.8; 400.6	161.9; 200.3	20.72; 25.64	20.72; 25.64	0.323; 0.400	166; 205	331; 410	32 MB		8 GB; 16 GB	320	GDDR6 128-Bit	20000	150 W 160 W	PCIe 5.0 ×16
Radeon RX 9070 GRE (Navi 48)	May, 2025 ¥4119 RMB	RDNA 4 TSMC N4P	53.9 billion 356.5 mm^{2}	3072:192:96:48:96; 48 CU	2200; 2790	422.4; 535.7	211.2; 267.8	27.03; 34.28	27.03; 34.28	0.422; 0.535	216; 274	432; 548	48 MB		12 GB	432	GDDR6; 192-bit	18000	220 W	PCIe 5.0 ×16
Radeon RX 9070 (Navi 48)	Mar 6, 2025 $549 USD	RDNA 4 TSMC N4P	53.9 billion 356.5 mm^{2}	3584:224:128:56:112; 56 CU	2070; 2520	463.6; 564.4	265.0; 322.6	29.67; 36.12	29.67; 36.12	0.463; 0.564	237; 289	475; 578	64 MB		16 GB	640	GDDR6; 256-bit	20000	220 W	PCIe 5.0 ×16
Radeon RX 9070 XT (Navi 48)	Mar 6, 2025 $599 USD	RDNA 4 TSMC N4P	53.9 billion 356.5 mm^{2}	4096:256:128:64:128; 64 CU	2400; 2970	614.4; 760.3	307.2; 380.2	39.32; 48.66	39.32; 48.66	0.614; 0.760	314; 389	629; 778	64 MB		16 GB	640	GDDR6; 256-bit	20000	304 W	PCIe 5.0 ×16

=== Workstation ===
==== Desktop workstation ====
Model (Code name)	Release date	Architecture & fab	Transistors & die size	Core		Fillrate (Note: Boost values (if available) are stated below the base value in italic.) (Note: Texture fillrate is calculated as the number of Texture Mapping Units multiplied by the base (or boost) core clock speed.) (Note: Pixel fillrate is calculated as the number of Render Output Units multiplied by the base (or boost) core clock speed.)		Processing power						Infinity Cache	Memory				TBP	Bus interface
Model (Code name)	Release date	Architecture & fab	Transistors & die size	Core		Fillrate		(TFLOPS) (Note: Precision performance is calculated from the base (or boost) core clock speed based on a FMA operation.)			AI TOPS (Note: Officially declared performance is twice the one shown here due to the use of sparsity.)			Infinity Cache	Memory				TBP	Bus interface
Model (Code name)	Release date	Architecture & fab	Transistors & die size	Config (Note: Unified shaders : Texture mapping units : Render output units : Ray accelerators : AI accelerators and Compute units (CU))	Clock (MHz)	Texture (GT/s)	Pixel (GP/s)	Half	Single	Double	FP8	INT8	INT4	Infinity Cache	Size (GB)	Bandwidth (GB/s)	Bus type & width	Clock (MT/s)	TBP	Bus interface
Radeon AI Pro R9600D (Navi 48)	Dec 11, 2025	RDNA 4 TSMC N4P	53.9 billion 357 mm^{2}	3072:192:96; 48:96:48 CU	1080; 2020	387.8	193.92	49.6	24.8	0.388	199	199	397	64 MB	32	640	GDDR6; 256-bit	20000	150 W	PCIe 5.0 ×16
Radeon AI Pro R9600 (Navi 48)	2026	RDNA 4 TSMC N4P	53.9 billion 357 mm^{2}	3072:192:96; 48:96:48 CU	1080; 2020	387.8	193.92	49.6	24.8	0.388	199	199	397	64 MB	32	640	GDDR6; 256-bit	20000	150 W	PCIe 5.0 ×16
Radeon AI Pro R9700S (Navi 48)	Dec 11, 2025	RDNA 4 TSMC N4P	53.9 billion 357 mm^{2}	4096:256:128; 64:128:64 CU	1660; 2920	425; 747.5	212.5; 373.76	54.4; 95.68	27.2; 47.84	0.425; 0.747	217.7; 383	217.7; 383	435.5; 766	64 MB	32	640	GDDR6; 256-bit	20000	300 W	PCIe 5.0 ×16
Radeon AI Pro R9700 (Navi 48)	Jul 23, 2025	RDNA 4 TSMC N4P	53.9 billion 357 mm^{2}	4096:256:128; 64:128:64 CU	1660; 2920	425; 747.5	212.5; 373.76	54.4; 95.68	27.2; 47.84	0.425; 0.747	217.7; 383	217.7; 383	435.5; 766	64 MB	32	640	GDDR6; 256-bit	20000	300 W	PCIe 5.0 ×16
