= San Francisco Rush: Extreme Racing =

1996 video game

- Arcade flyer
- Developer: Atari Games (Note: Nintendo 64 version developed by Midway; PlayStation version developed by Climax Development.)
- Publisher: Atari Games (Note: Nintendo 64, PlayStation, and Windows versions published by Midway)
- Producer: John Ray
- Designer: Spencer Lindsay: Nintendo 64 Ed Logg
- Programmer: Alan Gray
- Composer: Gunnar Madsen: Nintendo 64 Doug Brandon PlayStation Matthew Simmonds
- Series: Rush
- Platforms: Arcade, Nintendo 64, PlayStation, Windows
- Release: December 1996: Arcade; NA: December 1996 The Rock; NA: October 1997 Wave Net; NA: 1998 Nintendo 64; NA: November 7, 1997; EU: December 1997 PlayStation; NA: February 28, 1998; EU: April 2, 1998 Windows 1998
- Genre: Racing
- Modes: Single-player, multiplayer
- Arcade system: Atari Flagstaff

San Francisco Rush: Extreme Racing is a 1996 racing video game developed and published by Atari Games for arcades. It was ported to home consoles under the Midway label, beginning with the Nintendo 64 in 1997 and the PlayStation and Windows in 1998. An updated version named San Francisco Rush The Rock: Alcatraz Edition was released with more tracks and cars. It was a critical and commercial hit, and became the first in the Rush series, followed by San Francisco Rush 2049 (1999), bounded by the non-arcade Rush 2: Extreme Racing USA (1998).

== Gameplay ==
Gameplay screenshot of the Nintendo 64 version

San Francisco Rush involves racing through locations based on real-life locations across the city of San Francisco in California. Each race course has its own fixed difficulty based on the amount of obstacles and turns players may encounter. Players also choose their own cars each with its own difficulty, speed, and handling, with the "Extreme" cars being the highest; cars with this difficulty warns players that the car will provide a "full simulation" effect. Players also choose automatic and manual transmissions interchangeably. During each race, players race through several neighborhoods across San Francisco while remaining within a time limit throughout each lap. Their time is extended by crossing each "checkpoint" gate all the while. Players also can encounter shortcuts found on each track to save time and to reach higher position rankings to pass non-playing racers. Their cars can also explode if their car collides hard enough with an obstacle or if the car lands inverted. After which, the car will respawn back on track to continue where they left off. Players can also respawn their vehicles by using the "Abort" button.

== Development ==
San Francisco Rush was built around the 3dfx Voodoo Graphics dual chips. The 3dfx hardware was cheaper to develop for than proprietary systems, and Atari used the savings to sell the game at a lower price to arcade operators. It was unveiled at the 1996 Amusement & Music Operators Association (AMOA) show. After originally looking at maps of San Francisco, knowing that the cars would be going 150–160 mph, they realized that they would instead have to craft an alternate version of the city that was more 'fun'.

The new tracks included in The Rock: Alcatraz Edition were actually designed for the Nintendo 64 version of the game, with the sole exception of the Alcatraz track.

== Release ==
=== Arcade ===
Released in 1996, the original San Francisco Rush: Extreme Racing features three tracks that take place in San Francisco, California, and eight playable vehicles. San Francisco Rush: Extreme Racing is the first game to use Atari Games' Flagstaff engine.

Released in 1997, San Francisco Rush: The Rock was a ROM update for the original game, allowing arcade owners to extend the life of the original cabinet. This update implemented four additional tracks, including the Alcatraz track, and four additional cars, along with a "mirror" option to alter the direction of the race courses.

Released in 1998, San Francisco Rush: The Rock: Wave Net is the third and final installment of San Francisco Rush. It is an updated version of The Rock with support for multi-player online gaming using Midway's WaveNet against other arcades.

=== Nintendo 64 ===
Rush was ported to the Nintendo 64 in 1997. This conversion contains six tracks, with two of them containing secret stunt courses, plus one hidden track from both San Francisco Rush: Extreme Racing and San Francisco Rush The Rock: Alcatraz Edition. The regular tracks can be run in either reverse or mirrored modes and feature added collectible hidden keys throughout the track that can be used to unlock hidden vehicles. Most of the original cars appeared in this conversion, but some from San Francisco Rush The Rock: Alcatraz Edition are not present. This conversion contains a Practice Mode and a Death Race mode where all cars that crash during a race remain on the track in a wreck, thereby ending the game if the player crashes. The Nintendo 64 port of Rush also includes a Circuit Mode and a save system for Fast Times, circuit progress, and hidden keys that the player can find on secret spots to unlock new cars.

San Francisco Rush The Rock: Alcatraz Edition was presumed to be ported to the Nintendo 64 for release in 1998, but advertisements included in the box of the Nintendo 64 version stating the game was "Coming Fall 1998 for Nintendo 64" were later reported to be in error. The advert was actually intended solely for the arcade version, which includes all of the tracks that were already in the Nintendo 64 version, and Rush The Rock already released in arcades in October 1997. In the end, a Rush sequel with the complete Alcatraz track, Rush 2: Extreme Racing USA, released in 1998 in the US for the Nintendo 64.

=== PlayStation ===
Rush was ported to the PlayStation in 1998. This conversion contains three tracks, plus an exclusive bonus track. None of the original music from the arcade versions is present, and the announcer voice has been modified, but some of his voiceover is included in the game. Some of the modes from the Nintendo 64 port are included. The Death Race mode was renamed Extreme Race, and circuit mode was included but with fewer tracks. There are two exclusive modes: the GP Mode where the player plays ten races to earn points depending on where he/she finished, and the Explosive Mode which is a single race where the player's car will go ablaze and end the game if it goes under 60 mph. The PlayStation version has all eight original cars but none of the San Francisco Rush The Rock: Alcatraz Edition cars. The gameplay is also different from the arcade version, as the gravity is higher than the arcade version, reducing the jump airtime, and the steering sensitivity was also modified.

=== Other ports ===
San Francisco Rush: Extreme Racing was planned to be ported to the Game Boy Color, but the project was cancelled.

San Francisco Rush The Rock: Alcatraz Edition was released on PC exclusively with the Quantum3D Raven video card, and was designed to run only on that specific card. Versions slightly modified to remove the check for this card can run with some fidelity on other Glide-based cards of the era from 3Dfx, and by using a Glide wrapper, on more modern PCs.

== Reception ==
Reception

Aggregate score
Aggregator	Score		
Aggregator	Arcade	N64	PS
GameRankings	N/A	83%	39%

Review scores
Publication	Score		
Publication	Arcade	N64	PS
AllGame	N/A	3.5/5	1/5
Electronic Gaming Monthly	N/A	6.75/10	4.25/10
Game Informer	N/A	N/A	6.75/10
GameFan	N/A	234/300	N/A
GameSpot	N/A	7.1/10	3.1/10
IGN	N/A	8.9/10	5/10
N64 Magazine	N/A	82%	N/A
Next Generation	4/5	5/5	N/A
Nintendo Power	N/A	7.8/10	N/A
Player One	N/A	N/A	70%
Super Game Power	N/A	N/A	3.8/5
Video Games (DE)	N/A	N/A	53%
PlanetStation	N/A	N/A	3.5/5

San Francisco Rush was a major hit in arcades, and was cited as a comeback title restoring Atari Games' fortunes as an arcade game developer.

Next Generation reviewed the arcade version of the game, rating it four stars out of five, and stated that "what's coolest about this game are the shortcuts: into sewers, off broken-down freeways, onto skyscraper rooftops, and other unexpected places. Camouflaged in the urban settings of San Francisco, these shortcuts can cut players far ahead of opponents, or if they blow it and crash, a shortcut can set them back to the end of the pack. Either way, it adds a thrill of discovery not usually found in driving games and makes the risk well worth it."

Reviews for the Nintendo 64 port ranged from mixed to laudatory. For example, while Electronic Gaming Monthly's Kraig Kujawa called it "a nice-looking racer with major problems", co-reviewer Kelly Rickards described it as "fun to play and a solid addition to the Nintendo 64's already large library of racers", and Next Generation concluded that "SF Rush is just short of brilliant. It's a fun, challenging game that keeps you playing over and over again." Critics widely applauded the game's numerous hidden shortcuts, exhilarating and unrealistically high jumps, and inclusion of a multiplayer mode with a solid frame rate. GamePro remarked, "Never mind your heart - the death-defying leaps will make you leave your stomach in San Francisco."

The Nintendo 64 version's controls were more controversial. Next Generation and IGN both praised them as tight and balanced, but other critics experienced problems. GamePro, which gave the game a 4.5 out of 5 for fun factor and graphics but a 3.0 for control, said "The analog stick just isn't responsive, and there's no way to power slide." John Ricciardi and Crispin Boyer of Electronic Gaming Monthly both found the brakes so ineffectual that they had to put the car in reverse to handle turns, while Rickards said the control takes getting used to but ultimately works. The game's soundtrack was widely derided as the worst part of the game, though Next Generation deemed it enjoyable, and some critics found that a few of the tunes are so strident that they add a humorous camp value to the game.

Critics almost unanimously said the Nintendo 64 port satisfactorily emulated the arcade version, and praised the added console-exclusive content. However, GameSpot concluded that while the port was as faithful as it could be given the limitations of consumer hardware, it could not fully recreate the feel that sitting in the arcade cabinet gave. By contrast, IGN opined that "Because of all [its] new options and modes, SF Rush for Nintendo 64 feels like a whole new game -- a much better game designed for the home." The reviewer particularly noted how the additional secrets and the removal of the need to insert quarters more strongly encourages the player to explore.

Reviewing the PlayStation version, French magazine Player One praised the better steering when it comes to sharp turns, but criticized the graphics. Spanish magazine PlanetStation praised the jumps, speed, music, and multiple game modes, but criticized the graphics that are inconsistent with the framerate, and the minimal distinction between the playable cars.

== Sequels ==
San Francisco Rush was followed by three sequels; the first was Rush 2: Extreme Racing USA, released in 1998 exclusively on Nintendo 64. In 1999, Atari released San Francisco Rush 2049 for the arcade, months prior to retiring the Atari name before being renamed to Midway Games West, amid Midway's ownership restructuring. In the following year, Midway Games ported 2049 to the Dreamcast, Nintendo 64, and Game Boy Color; all home ports were released in the final quarter of 2000.

In 2000, Midway developed another sequel to Rush 2049 named Hot Rod Rebels, which was planned to be released exclusively for arcades, but was soon cancelled when Midway shut down their arcade market due to declining sales.

The third and final game, L.A. Rush, was released for the PlayStation 2 and Xbox in 2005, and for Windows computers in the following year in 2006. Around the same year, the game was later ported to the PSP under the title Rush.
