= San Francisco Rush 2049 =

1999 video game

- Arcade flyer
- Developers: Atari Games: Arcade; WW: Atari Games Dreamcast, Nintendo 64; WW: Midway Games West Game Boy Color; WW: Handheld Games
- Publishers: Atari Games: Arcade; WW: Atari Games Consoles; WW: Midway Home Entertainment
- Producer: John Ray
- Designer: Ed Logg (home versions)
- Programmer: Chris Emsen (GBC)
- Artist: Thomas Fessler (GBC)
- Composers: Mike Henry; Barry Leitch
- Series: Rush
- Platforms: Arcade; Nintendo 64; Game Boy Color; Dreamcast
- Release: Arcade: NA: September 1999; Dreamcast, Game Boy Color, Nintendo 64: NA: September 6, 2000; PAL: November 17, 2000 (DC, N64); PAL: December 1, 2000 (GBC); Microsoft Windows: NA: February 17, 2006; PAL: March 17, 2006
- Genre: Racing
- Modes: Single-player, multiplayer
- Arcade system: 3dfx Voodoo 3 Quantum3D

San Francisco Rush 2049 is a 1999 racing video game developed and published by Atari Games for arcades. It was later ported to home systems. It is the third game in the Rush series as the sequel to San Francisco Rush: Extreme Racing and Rush 2: Extreme Racing USA as well as the last to be set in the city of San Francisco. An updated version with fixes and more tracks was later released subtitled Tournament Edition.

The game was ported to the Nintendo 64, Game Boy Color, and Dreamcast starting in September 2000 under the Midway Games West label, which Midway Games had replaced the Atari Games name with. The Dreamcast version was later re-released as part of Midway Arcade Treasures 3 for the PlayStation 2, Xbox, and GameCube and later for Microsoft Windows as part of Midway Arcade Treasures Deluxe Edition. A sequel, Hot Rod Rebels, was under development but cancelled. The next entry in the series would be L.A. Rush in 2005, which would not be set in the city of San Francisco.

== Gameplay ==
Gameplay screenshot (arcade version)

The game features an arcade-style physics engine. Tracks are based around a futuristic representation of San Francisco. Cars have the ability to extend wings from their sides in the 3D console versions, allowing for mid-air adjustments. This feature is a product of the science fiction setting and as such is not seen in other entries in the Rush series. As with previous titles in the franchise, Rush 2049 features a stunt mode in which the player scores points for complex mid-air maneuvers and successful landings. The game also includes a multiplayer deathmatch battle mode and race mode for up to four players. There are six race tracks, four stunt arenas, eight battle arenas, and one unlockable obstacle course named the Gauntlet. Various car types and upgrades are unlockable throughout the game, though cheat codes offer instant achievement of these elements. The single-player race mode encourages exploration of high-difficulty off-track shortcuts, creating a risk and reward structure to the gameplay.

The arcade version was an eight-player game (but more commonly bought in pairs), a sit-down machine with force feedback steering wheels, gear shifts, and three pedals (gas, brake, and clutch). A telephone-like keypad to the right of the steering wheel gave players the option of choosing a PIN and allowed them to earn points to unlock new cars and tracks. The machine used a 3dfx Voodoo 3 graphics card.

== Development and release ==
The original San Francisco Rush 2049 was released in August or September 1999. This version features a roster of five playable tracks and eight different cars, with more unlocked as the player progresses through the game. In each stage, the player must race seven other CPU-controlled cars. The racetracks contain a total of 100 coins, which, when found, unlock new cars and paint jobs.

In 2000, Midway released an upgraded version, Tournament Edition, that fixed bugs and added two new tracks, four cars, and new shortcuts. It also had the ability to connect to an external server, via a T1 network connection, which allowed players to race against others in an online tournament. The upgrade was recalled soon after as Midway shut down its online tournament network, although it may still be found in a few sites that retained it, such as Video Bobs Starbase Arcade in San Rafael, which was heavily involved in play-testing as a result of their proximity to the Midway West campus.

In 2003, Betson Enterprises released an upgrade, called San Francisco Rush 2049 Special Edition, which brought back the tracks, cars, and shortcuts from Tournament Edition but removed online play due to Midway Tournament Network being shut down. This game was the final game released to carry the Atari Games moniker prior to the company being renamed Midway Games West later that year, with the Special Edition version release being the final Midway arcade game altogether, released two years after Midway shut down their arcade division and just before Midway Games West shut down that same year.

=== Ports ===
San Francisco Rush 2049 was ported to the Nintendo 64 and the Dreamcast in 2000 by Midway Games West. The Nintendo 64 and Sega Dreamcast versions, as in the original arcade version, contain Dickies and Slim Jim advertisements. When released under license as Midway Arcade Treasures 3, the Slim Jim advertisements were removed and replaced with Midway Games logos. All 3D console ports featured a variation from the arcade version, that being the addition of stunt wings. The arcade version did not feature the stunt wing ability, which allowed players to perform maneuvers in the air whilst gliding.

San Francisco Rush 2049 was also ported to the Game Boy Color by Handheld Games and published by Midway Home Entertainment. The tracks differ from the other versions whilst the cars are mostly identical. The racing takes place from a top-down perspective.

Midway Games had plans to create a double pack for Hydro Thunder and San Francisco Rush 2049 under the name Hydro Rush for the Sony PlayStation 2, but the game was canceled when the project moved to Midway Arcade Treasures 3.

== Reception ==
Reception

Aggregate scores
Aggregator	Score		
Aggregator	Dreamcast	GBC	N64
GameRankings	83%	50%	85%
Metacritic	84/100	N/A	86/100

Review scores
Publication	Score		
Publication	Dreamcast	GBC	N64
AllGame	3.5/5	2/5	N/A
CNET Gamecenter	N/A	N/A	8/10
Electronic Gaming Monthly	6/10	7/10	8.5/10
Game Informer	7/10	N/A	N/A
GamePro	4.5/5 (Note: GamePro gave the Dreamcast version two 4/5 scores for graphics and control, 3/5 for sound, and 4.5/5 for overall fun factor.)	N/A	4.5/5 (Note: GamePro gave the Nintendo 64 version three 4.5/5 scores for graphics, control, and overall fun factor, and 4/5 for sound.)
GameRevolution	A−	N/A	N/A
GameSpot	8/10	3.6/10	7.4/10
GameSpy	6.5/10	N/A	N/A
IGN	9/10	6/10	9/10
N64 Magazine	N/A	N/A	91%
Next Generation	5/5	N/A	N/A
Nintendo Power	N/A	6/10	7.6/10

The Dreamcast and Nintendo 64 versions received "favorable" reviews according to the review aggregation website Metacritic. Jeff Lundrigan of NextGen gave the positive reviews for the former console version.

During the 4th Annual Interactive Achievement Awards, the Academy of Interactive Arts & Sciences nominated the Dreamcast version for the "Console Racing" award, which ultimately went to SSX.
