= Luis Da Silva =

Portuguese actor

Luis Da Silva Jr
- Luiz Da Silva Jr in 2016
- Born: Luis Fernando Da Silva Jr. August 3, 1982 (age 44); Elizabeth, New Jersey, U.S.
- Occupations: Actor, freestyle basketball pioneer, author, producer
- Years active: 2001–present
- Website: www.luisdasilvajr.com

Luis Fernando Da Silva Jr. (born August 3, 1982), also known as Trikz, is an American actor, basketball player, author, and producer. He gained fame after headlining the 2001 Nike Freestyle ad campaign.

== Basketball career ==
In a 2001 episode of This American Life, Da Silva was the first streetball athlete to be signed to an advertising contract by Nike. He performed with Alicia Keys in 2001 in New York City's Niketown while promoting the well known Nike campaign. He was subsequently mentioned in Scoop Jackson’s main division, titled Sole Provider, which recognized the best of Nike’s 35-year chronicle. In 2003, Da Silva was the youngest player signed to the Harlem Wizards Show basketball team.

Midway Games offered Da Silva a lead in the 2005 video game, L.A. Rush, which sold 1 million units internationally. He has also worked with Midway performing the video game motion capturing for NBA Ballers, NBA Ballers: Phenom, NBA Ballers: Chosen One, NBA 2K8, NBA 2K9 and AND 1 Streetball video games. He has been featured in magazines SLAM and DIME and on the front page of The Wall Street Journal and the cover of TIME overseas.

In 2006, Stephon Marbury and Steve & Barry's announced that Da Silva would hit the road on the Starbury SLAM Tour, with the first of many appearances at Steve & Barry's stores and schools across 120 cities in 60 days to perform his unique style of hip hop themed basketball wizardry in front of kids and parents. Andy Todd, president of Steve & Barry's, said "Trikz is not only a phenomenal performer; he's also a phenomenal guy who kids will enjoy seeing and hearing."

In August 2007, Da Silva fulfilled a childhood dream when he was invited to participate in a Harlem Globetrotters mini-camp in Houston, TX and two days into the camp was offered a contract to join the legendary team.

In October 2008, the Maryland Nighthawks announced that they selected Da Silva with the 14th overall pick as part of their official "Travel team" of the PBL this year, and are set to tour China and other Asian countries during the season.

In 2009, Da Silva achieved a personal goal of setting a Guinness World Record of 24 consecutive neck catches of a basketball. In 2009, Da Silva became the youngest person ever inducted into the City of Elizabeth Athletic Hall of Fame.

Da Silva performed during the 2010 World Basketball Festival in New York City, while the Jay-Z performance took place in the Radio City Music Hall, all presented by Nike.

== Acting career ==
Da Silva began appearing in such films as The Brave One and Pride & Glory in the late 2000s.

He has produced and directed an instructional DVD entitled Freestyle 101, which has been created into an Apple application available on iTunes and Apple store. This DVD is a streetball tutorial that is devoted to inspiring children, adolescents and adults to use basketball in a creative and challenging way of physical fitness.

In 2011, Da Silva played Diogo in Fast Five, a role he reprised in 2023's Fast X. He also appeared in the 2012 comedy 21 Jump Street, gaining increasing exposure. With the release of 2013's Dead Man Down, he had his biggest role yet, as Terrence Howard's righthand man, Terry. This was followed up by a role in the 2013 summer hit The Heat featuring Sandra Bullock and Melissa McCarthy.

In 2014, he completed filming roles for several films, like Convergence, Aztec Warrior, American Heist, American Project, American Hero, Triple 9, and Mr. Right.

Da Silva has roles in many of John Travolta's pictures, Gotti, The Fanatic and Speed Kills.

He appears on television in roles on series like Graceland, Person of Interest and Power.

=== Filmography ===
Film/Television
Year	Title	Role	Notes
2004	Law & Order: Criminal Intent	Marvin	TV – 1 episode
2007	The Brave One	Lee	
2008	Pride and Glory	Dominican Bodega Customer	
2009	Clear Lake, WI	Jason	
2010	Mercy	Burned Prisoner	TV – 1 episode
2010	Southern Fried Stings	Guy	TV – 1 episode
2010	America's Most Wanted	Various	TV – 9 episodes
2010	Burn Notice	Prison Gang	TV – 3 episodes
2011	Loving the Bad Man	Alejandro Garcia De La Paz	
2011	The Mortician	Benny	
2011	Fast Five	Diogo	
2011	Treme	Brazilian Foreman	TV – 1 episode
2011	Remnants	Russ	Also associate producer
2011	In a Pickle	Latino toughs	
2011	CO2	Latino Gang Member	
2012	Dragon Eyes	"Dash"	
2012	21 Jump Street	Luis	
2012	The Baytown Outlaws	Large Vatos	
2012	Hound Dogs	Orlando	Pilot episode
2013	Dead Man Down	Terry	
2013	Body of Proof	Oscar Ramirez	TV- 1 episode
2013	The Heat	Dealer #4	
2013	Aztec Warrior	Chupacabra Leader	
2015	Kickboxer: Vengeance	Stahl	
2015	Mr. Right	Espinoza	
2015–2016	Power	Mexican Hitter	
2016	Triple 9	Luis Pinto	
2016	I Am Wrath	Charley "Fly" Lawes	
2016	Wolves	Defender W.4th	
2016	Paterson	Blood In Convertible	
2017	Hidden America with Jonah Ray	Gabriel	
2017	Gotti	Dr. Carmine	
2017	The Girl Who Invented Kissing	Luis	
2018	Speed Kills	Panama	
2018	Trading Paint	Diner Redneck	
2022	One Way	J.J.	
2023	Little Dixie	Juan Miguel Prado	
2023	Fast X	Diogo	

Video games
Year	Title	Role	Notes
2004	NBA Ballers	Trikz	
2005	L.A. Rush	Trikz Lane	Main role
2006	AND 1 Streetball	Trikz	

== Writing career ==
Silva published his first children's book titled A Boy Named Boo, which he wrote and illustrated.
