= Alliance Semiconductor =

Defunct American semiconductor company

Alliance Semiconductor Corporation
- Company type: Public
- Industry: Semiconductor
- Founded: 1985; 41 years ago in Cupertino, California, United States
- Founders: N. Damodar Reddy; C. N. Reddy
- Defunct: 2006; 20 years ago
- Fate: Dissolution; assets acquired by multiple companies
- Headquarters: San Jose, California, United States

Alliance Semiconductor Corporation was an American semiconductor company active from 1985 to 2006 and originally based in San Jose, California. The company specialized in the design and manufacture of dynamic random-access memory (DRAM) and static random-access memory (SRAM). It also designed the silicon for graphics accelerator chips, among other fields. In 2006, the company dissolved, its intellectual property and other assets sold to various companies.

== History ==
=== Foundation (1985–1989) ===
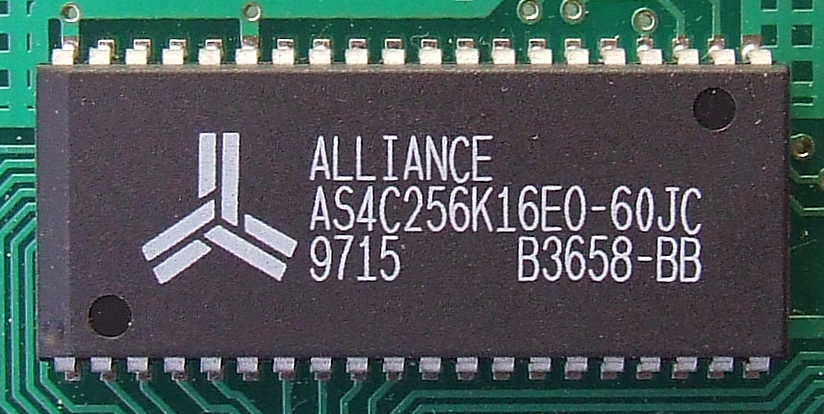
Close-up of an Alliance dynamic random-access memory (DRAM) chip, dated 1997

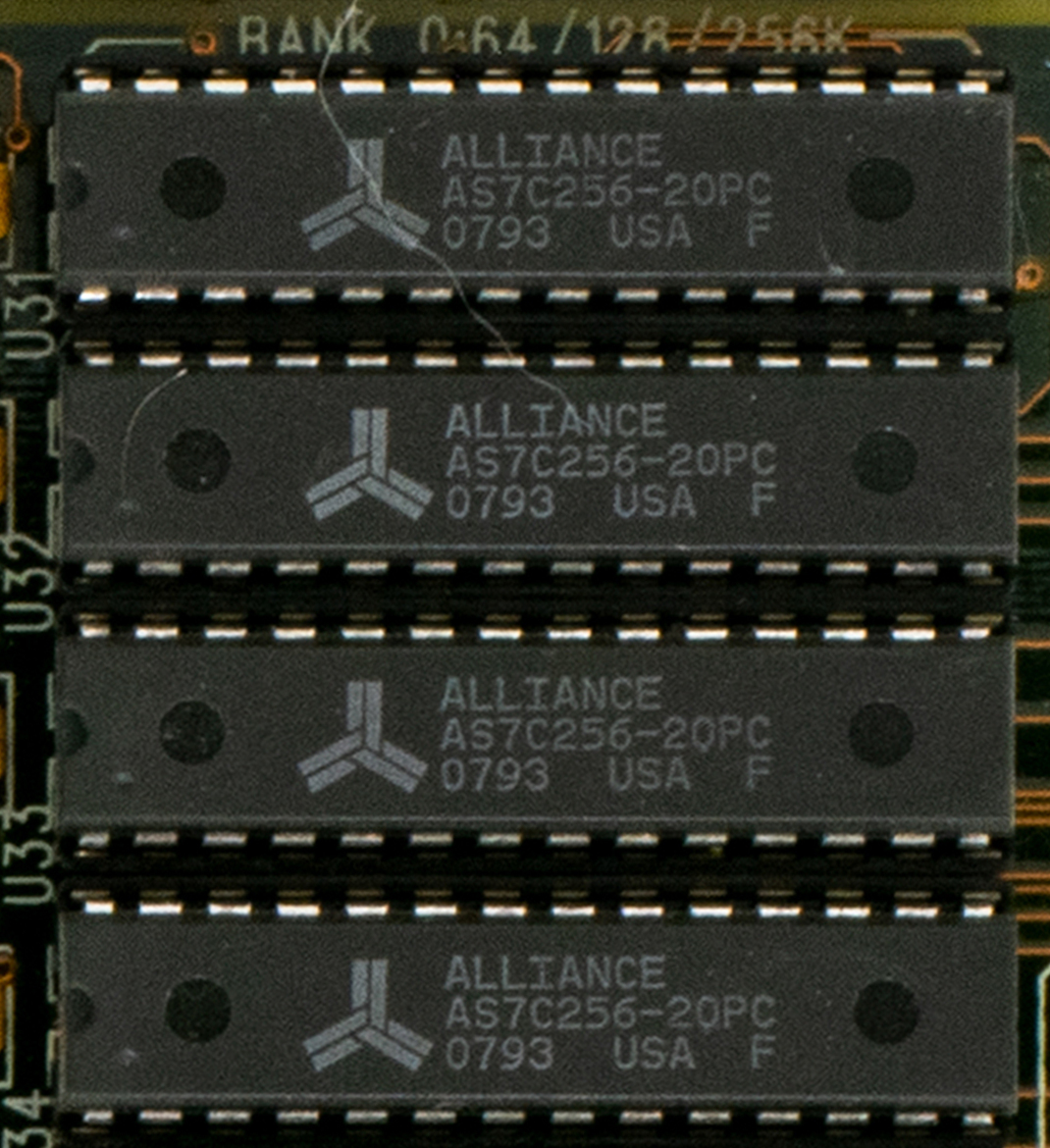
4 SRAM cache chips from Alliance

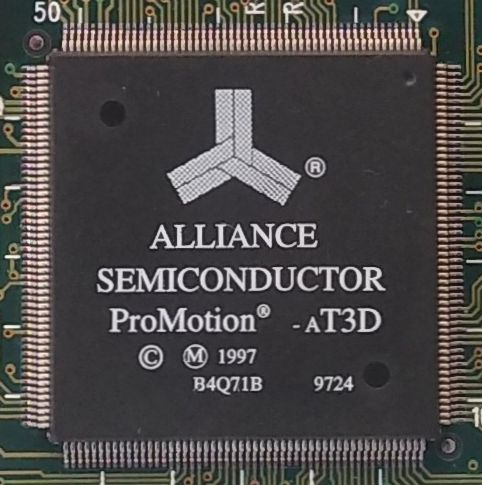
Alliance ProMotion AT25 graphics chip on a Voodoo Rush

Alliance Semiconductor Corporation was founded in Cupertino, California, by N. Damodar "Dan" Reddy and C. N. "Nick" Reddy in 1985. Both men were brothers who had emigrated to the United States from India in the 1960s to receive advanced electrical engineering degrees. N. Damodar Reddy, the elder of the two, had worked in the semiconductor industry designing a variety of circuits since 1969, working at firms such as Synertek, Fairchild, RCA, and Four-Phase, before founding Alliance. C. N. Reddy meanwhile had worked strictly on memory circuit design for Texas Instruments and Cypress Semiconductor since the late 1970s. In 1987, by which point it had relocated to San Jose, California, the company patented a high-speed 1-Mb dynamic RAM (DRAM) chip, licensing the rights to fabricate the chip to Japan-based Minebea in 1988.

=== Botched fabrication plant and Chapter 11 bankruptcy (1989–1991) ===
Between 1989 and 1990, the company made a high-profile attempt to start a memory chip foundry in the United States, leasing a dilapidated plant in Kansas City, Missouri, owned by AT&T Microelectronics. The Reddy brothers had high hopes that the Alliance factory would rejuvenate interest in manufacturing DRAM among American semiconductor foundries, who had largely retreated from this market segment in the mid-1980s owing to intense competition from Japanese conglomerates. Wealthy benefactors and disparate corporations from Kansas City, including UtiliCorp United and Hallmark Cards, had poured millions of dollars into the project, hoping that it would create a high-tech industry in the area.

The Reddys predicted that they could eventually hire 1,200 to work at the factory. Within a year of operations however, the factory struggled with producing satisfactory yields and ultimately generated massive losses for Alliance. It was forced to close in 1990; Alliance filed for Chapter 11 bankruptcy in 1991. Industry analysts blamed Alliance's misfortunes on AT&Ts "obsolete" and poorly maintained equipment, a downturn in global DRAM shipments, and inadequate funding on the part of Alliance.

=== Exiting bankruptcy, growth, and portfolio expansion (1991–2001) ===
Alliance survived bankruptcy reorganization, exiting Chapter 11 in 1991 and becoming a publicly traded company in December 1993. The company abandoned pretenses of ever managing its own chip manufacturing plant, spending the rest of its existence as a fabless outfit, focusing on designing DRAM and static RAM (SRAM). The company posted healthy profits in the early 1990s, earning $2 million between 1992 and 1993; $8.7 million between 1993 and 1994; and $23.9 million between 1994 and 1995. Revenues grew exponentially during this period as well, reaching $119.3 million in the period between March 1994 and March 1995.

Although SRAM and DRAM remained Alliance's dominant focus, the company began diversifying slightly in the mid-1990s after acquiring Nimbus Technology, a GPU designer, in 1993. In 1995, they debuted the first of their ProMotion graphics adapter cards. Sales of ProMotion cards represented 10 percent of Alliance's total sales in 1995.

Alliance's semiconductor investment portfolio in the late 1990s netted the company even more earnings. In February 1995, Alliance signed onto a $10-million investment in Chartered Semiconductor Manufacturing, a startup chip maker based in Singapore. The company invested an addition $41.6 million later that year, increasing its stake and receiving a guaranteed 15-percent share of production. When Chartered went public in November 1999, Alliance's stake was worth $198 million. In July 1995, Alliance formed a joint venture with S3 Graphics and United Microelectronics Corporation (UMC) to build a US$1-billion semiconductor plant in Hsinchu, Taiwan, with Alliance investing $60 million. Between 1996 and 1997, Alliance respectively invested $57.5 million and $16.8 million in United Semiconductor and United Silicon, two Taiwanese semiconductor startups. UMC soon after bought out both in their entirety, Alliance receiving over 283 shares of UMC in exchange for relinquishing their stakes in both. By 2000 Alliance's shares in UMC soon were worth over US$1 billion.

In 2002 the company was rejected exemption from having to register as an investment company under the Investment Company Act of 1940 by the U.S. Securities and Exchange Commission, as Alliance's assets in investment securities for publicly traded chip foundries had accounted for more than 40 percent of Alliance's total assets. This forced Alliance to sell off large portions of their shares in these companies.

=== Decline and dissolution (2001–2006) ===
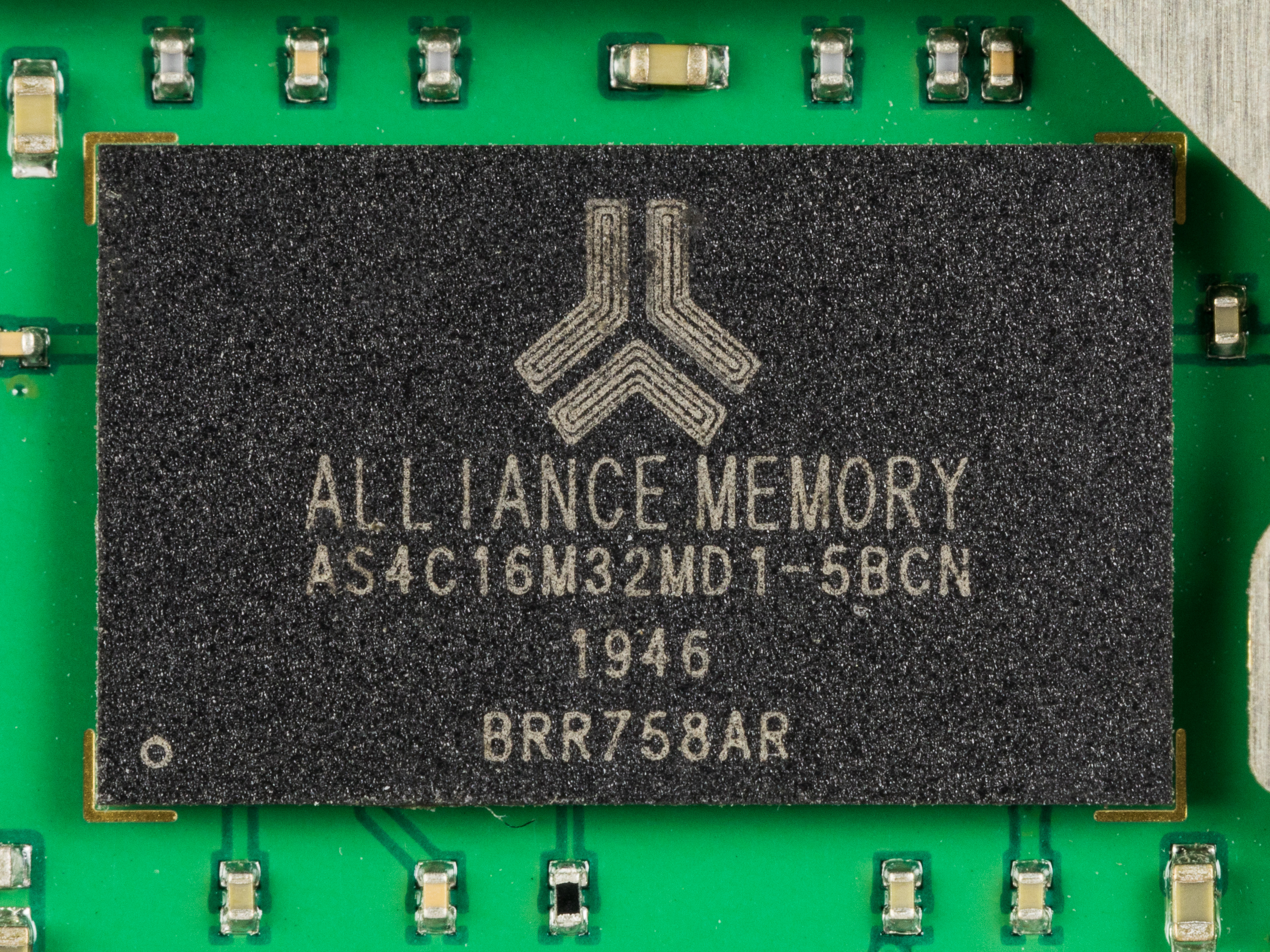
A 512 MBit LPDDR chip from Alliance Memory

In the immediate aftermath of the dot-com bubble bursting, Alliance saw its revenues and sales cut in half in the first two fiscal quarters of 2001. By the mid-2000s the company was severely financially troubled, and in March 2006, founder N. Damodar Reddy resigned as chairman of Alliance, while remaining on the board of directors. The company's new chairman, Bryant R. Riley, began the process of dissolving Alliance that year, first selling off its chipset technologies business for US$5.8 million to Tundra Semiconductor, who acquired that division's patents and rehired over 50 of its engineers, in April 2006. The following month, Alliance Semiconductor spun off their asynchronous SRAM division as Alliance Memory. In June 2006, Alliance's analog/mixed-signal was spun off as PulseCore Semiconductor, which in turn was acquired by ON Semiconductor in 2009. Finally, in July 2006, Integrated Silicon Solution, Inc., purchased Alliance's remaining SRAM intellectual property.

== See also ==
- MoSys
