= Rush (video game series) =

Video game series

- Genre: Racing
- Developers: Atari Games (1996–1999); Midway Games (2000–2006)
- Publishers: Atari Games (1996–1999); Midway Games (1997–2006)
- Platforms: Arcade, Nintendo 64, PlayStation, PC, Dreamcast, Game Boy Color, PlayStation 2, Xbox, GameCube, PlayStation Portable
- First release: San Francisco Rush: Extreme Racing; December 1996
- Latest release: L.A. Rush; October 10, 2005

Rush is a series of racing video games developed by American-based company Atari Games and published by Atari Games and Midway Games for home consoles. The series debuted worldwide in 1996. The games consist mainly of racing with various cars on various tracks while players perform stunts in races.

== Rush series ==
=== San Francisco Rush: Extreme Racing ===
The original San Francisco Rush: Extreme Racing was released in 1996 in the arcades and included 3 tracks and 8 cars.

==== San Francisco Rush: Extreme Racing (home version) ====
The original arcade version was followed by the home version for the Nintendo 64 in 1997. This included 3 additional cars (bringing the total to 11) and four additional tracks (bringing the total to 7; 1 of these tracks was hidden). The game also included new shortcuts that were not in the arcade's original three tracks. Within the game's 6th track is a hidden stunt track. Several months after the game's release, there were rumors about a bonus "Alcatraz Track" hidden within the game. Via a special code, or through such hardware like GameShark, an unfinished version of the Alcatraz track could be unlocked within the game. The developers of the game later revealed, via interviews with IGN, that the track was originally to be included in the final release, but was cancelled by the publisher due to the cartridge running out of space to hold the finalized track. Instead, the developers decided to hide the track within the game, rather than completely delete it. The version plays like a beta, with many textures unfinished on the track and lacks many shortcuts. The finalized version of the track was eventually released in "San Francisco Rush The Rock: Alcatraz Edition" in arcades and Rush 2 for the Nintendo 64.

==== San Francisco Rush The Rock: Alcatraz Edition ====
Also released in 1997, San Francisco Rush The Rock: Alcatraz Edition included the 4 new tracks from the home version and added additional shortcuts to them all. 4 new cars were also added which are also included in the next Rush game.

=== Rush 2: Extreme Racing USA ===
Rush 2: Extreme Racing USA was released in 1998 on the Nintendo 64. This is the first game in the series that does not include the core three tracks from the original San Francisco Rush, and the first, and only, that includes multiple cities to race in. It is also the first Rush game to have a proper stunt track (rather than the hidden stunt track in the Nintendo 64 version of San Francisco Rush). Like the last home game, new cars are unlocked by collecting keys but now Mountain Dew cans are also featured. Rush 2 includes every car that was used in its predecessors and includes several more (both hidden and default) that are new to Rush.

=== San Francisco Rush 2049 ===
San Francisco Rush 2049 was released in arcades in 1999. It features 4 all-new tracks as well as a returning track, Alcatraz, re-invented for the future. Unlike Rush 2, Rush 2049 does not carry over cars from the previous game. Except for two returning cars, all cars in this game are new. Also new is Rush 2049 uses coins, which replace keys when unlocking new cars. Two rarer versions of Rush 2049 exist: SF Rush 2049 TE and SF Rush 2049 SE, which stand for "Tournament Edition" and "Special Edition", respectively. These games featured 2 additional tracks and a number of additional cars, as well as bug fixes (mostly to eliminate certain dubious racing practices). The SE version was produced by Betson Enterprises and released in 2003.

==== San Francisco Rush 2049 (home version) ====
The home version of San Francisco Rush 2049 was released in 2000 for the Dreamcast and Nintendo 64 with major changes. The Alcatraz track from the arcade version was removed to make way for improvements of stunt mode. New modes introduced are multiplayer battle mode and special obstacle course. The game includes the 2 race tracks from "Tournament Edition", 4 stunt arenas, and 8 battle venues. A new feature for cars is the wings, a trademark feature that gives the player axial control over their car and a slightly more gradual descent while airborne.

The Dreamcast version of the game was also included in the Midway Arcade Treasures 3 collection for the PlayStation 2, Xbox, and GameCube.

=== L.A. Rush ===
L.A. Rush is the fourth and final game in the Rush series, released in 2005 and featuring an open-world design and licensed vehicles.

== Games ==
- San Francisco Rush: Extreme Racing (Arcade - 1996)
- San Francisco Rush: Extreme Racing (Nintendo 64 - 1997)
- San Francisco Rush The Rock: Alcatraz Edition (Arcade - 1997)
- San Francisco Rush The Rock: Alcatraz Edition (PC - 1998) - a PC port released exclusively as a pack-in game for the Quantum3D Raven graphics card.
- San Francisco Rush: WaveNet (Arcade - 1998)
- San Francisco Rush: Extreme Racing (PlayStation - 1998)
- Rush 2: Extreme Racing USA (Nintendo 64 - 1998)
- San Francisco Rush 2049 (Arcade - 1999)
- San Francisco Rush 2049 (Dreamcast and Nintendo 64 - 2000)
- San Francisco Rush 2049 (Game Boy Color - 2000)
- L.A. Rush (PlayStation 2, Xbox, PC - 2005)
- Rush (PlayStation Portable - 2006)

The Midway Arcade Treasures 3 compilation released for the GameCube, PS2, and Xbox in 2005 contains ports of San Francisco Rush The Rock: Alcatraz Edition and the Dreamcast version of San Francisco Rush 2049. The 2006 PC-only Midway Arcade Treasures Deluxe Edition compilation also includes those ports.
