= 3dfx =

American computer hardware company

3dfx Interactive, Inc.
- Industry: Semiconductors
- Founded: August 24, 1994; 32 years ago
- Founders: Ross Smith, Scott Sellers, Gary Tarolli
- Defunct: October 15, 2002; 24 years ago
- Fate: Bankrupt; acquired by Nvidia Corporation
- Headquarters: San Jose, California, U.S.
- Products: Voodoo Graphics series
- Website: 3dfx.com at the Wayback Machine (archived February 1, 2001)

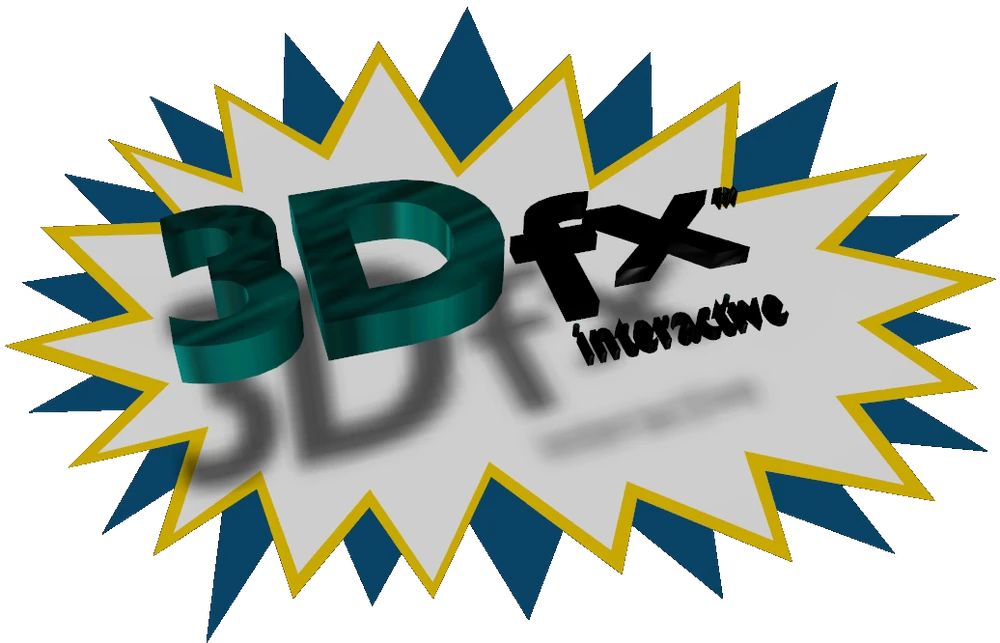
Logo used from 1996 to 1998

3dfx Interactive, Inc. was an American computer hardware company headquartered in San Jose, California, founded in 1994, that specialized in the manufacturing of 3D graphics processing units, and later, video cards. It was a pioneer in the field from the mid 1990s to 2000.

The company's original product was the Voodoo Graphics, an add-in card that implemented hardware acceleration of 3D graphics. The hardware accelerated only 3D rendering, relying on the PC's current video card for 2D support. Despite this limitation, the Voodoo Graphics product and its follow-up, Voodoo2, were popular. It became standard for 3D games to offer support for the company's Glide API.

Renewed interest in 3D games led to the success of the company's products and by the second half of the 1990s products combining a 2D output with 3D performance were appearing. This was accelerated by the introduction of Microsoft's Direct3D, which provided a single high-performance API that could be implemented on these cards, seriously eroding the value of Glide. While 3dfx continued to offer high-performance options, the value proposition was no longer compelling.

In the late 1990s 3dfx had an infringement lawsuit which combined with lower sales in the latter years led Nvidia to acquire 3dfx for their engineers, which they acquired around one hundred of. Most of the company's assets were acquired by Nvidia Corporation on December 15, 2000, mostly for intellectual property rights. The acquisition was accounted for as a purchase by Nvidia and was completed by the first quarter of its fiscal year of 2002. 3dfx ceased supporting its products on February 15, 2001, and filed for bankruptcy on October 15, 2002.

== Company history ==
=== Early products ===
==== First chips ====
The company was founded on August 24, 1994, as 3D/fx, Inc. by Ross Smith, Gary Tarolli and Scott Sellers, all former employees of Silicon Graphics Inc. They were soon joined by Gordie Campbell of TechFarm. 3dfx released its first product, the Voodoo Graphics 3D chip, to manufacturing on November 6, 1995. The chip is a VGA 3D accelerator that features rendering methods such as point-sampled texture mapping, Z- and double buffering, Gouraud shading, subpixel correction, alpha compositing, and anti-aliasing. Alongside the chip came 3dfx's Glide API, designed to take full advantage of the Voodoo Graphics' features. The company stated that Glide's creation was because it found that no existing APIs at the time could fully utilize the chip's capabilities. DirectX 3.0 was deemed to be lacking, and OpenGL was regarded as suitable only for CAD/CAM workstations. The first graphics card to use the chip was Orchid Technology's Righteous 3D, released on October 7, 1996. The company manufactured only the chips and some reference boards, and initially did not sell any product to consumers; rather, it acted as an OEM supplier for graphics card companies, which designed, manufactured, marketed, and sold their own graphics cards including the Voodoo chipset.

3dfx gained initial fame in the arcade market. The first arcade machine that 3dfx Voodoo Graphics hardware was used in was a 1996 baseball game featuring a bat controller with motion sensing technology called ICE Home Run Derby. Later that year it was featured in more popular titles, such as Atari's San Francisco Rush and Wayne Gretzky's 3D Hockey. 3dfx also developed MiniGL after id Software's John Carmack released a 1997 version of Quake that used the OpenGL API. The MiniGL translated OpenGL commands into Glide, and gave 3dfx the advantage as the sole consumer chip company to deliver a functional graphics library driver until 1998.

==== Entry to the consumer market ====
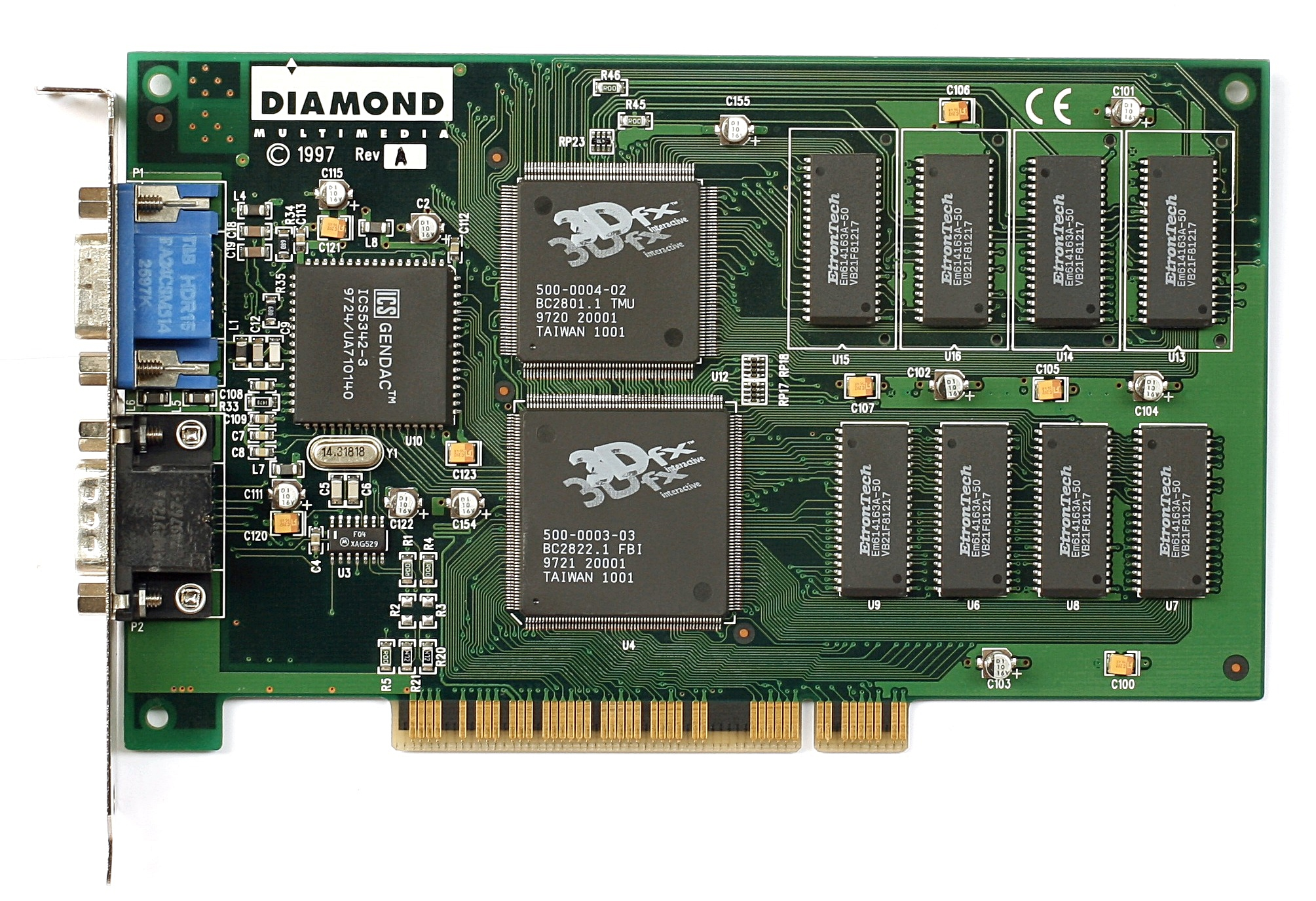
The Diamond Monster 3D was the most popular graphics card using the Voodoo Graphics chipset.

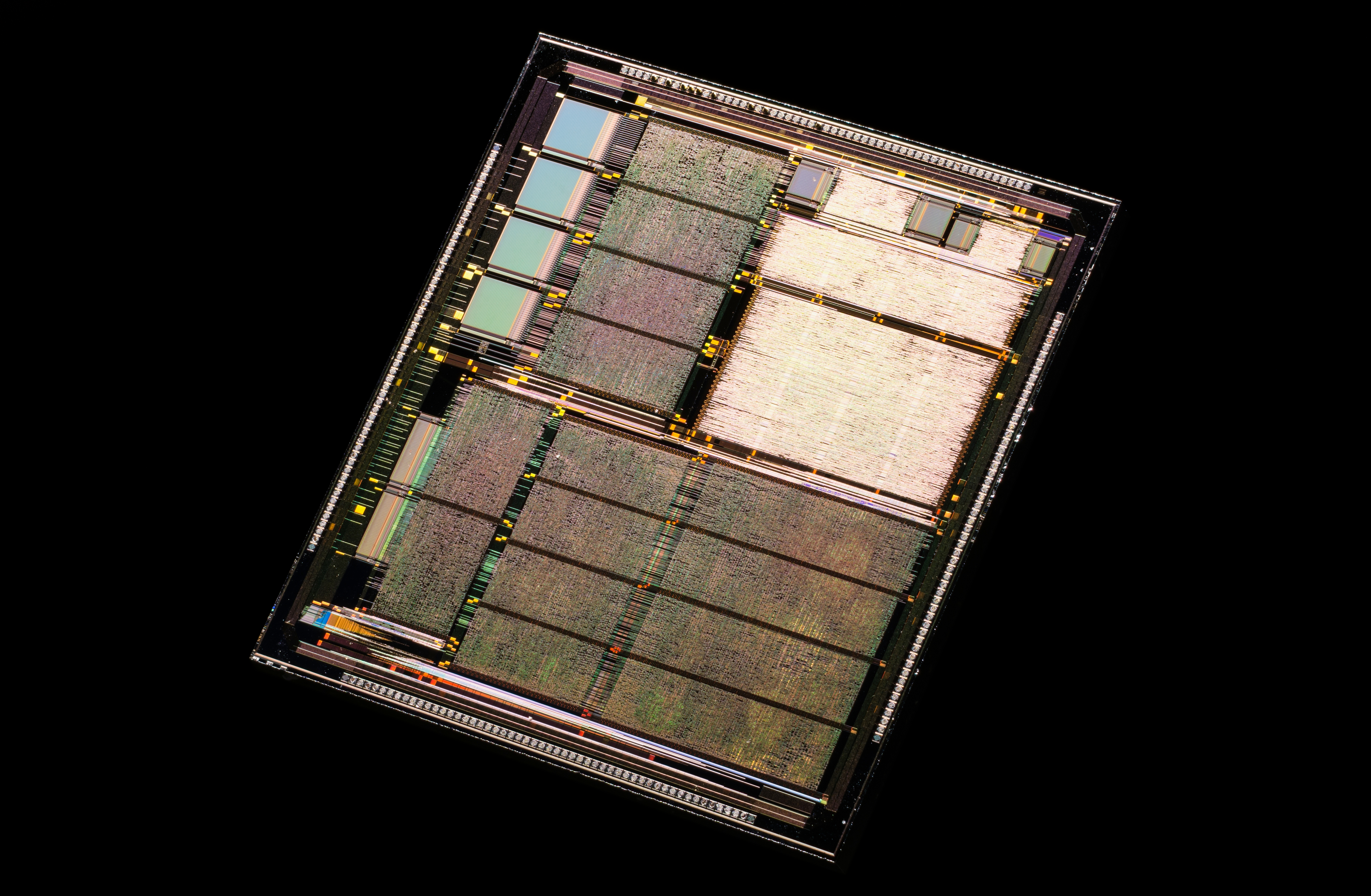
A die shot of the Voodoo Graphics texture mapping chip

Towards the end of 1995, the cost of DRAM dropped significantly and 3dfx was able to enter the consumer PC hardware market with aggressive pricing compared to the few previous 3D graphics solutions for computers. Prior to affordable 3D hardware, games such as Doom and Quake had compelled video game players to move from their 80386s to 80486s, and then to the Pentium.

By the end of 1997, the Voodoo Graphics was by far the most widely adopted 3D accelerator among both consumers and software developers. The Voodoo's primary competition was from PowerVR and Rendition. PowerVR produced a similar 3D-only add-on card with capable 3D support, although it was not comparable to Voodoo Graphics in either image quality or performance. 3dfx did not see intense competition in the market from cards that offered the combination of 2D and 3D acceleration. While these cards, such as the Nvidia NV1, Matrox Mystique, S3 ViRGE, Vérité V1000, and ATI 3D Rage, offered inferior 3D acceleration in terms of image quality, performance, or both, their lower cost and simplicity often appealed to OEM system builders.

==== Dreamcast ====
In 1997, 3dfx was working with entertainment company Sega to develop a new video game console hardware platform. Sega solicited two competing designs: a unit code-named "Katana", developed in Japan using NEC and Imagination Technologies (then VideoLogic) technology, and "Blackbelt", a system designed in the United States using 3dfx technology.

However, on July 22, 1997, 3dfx announced that Sega was terminating the development contract. Sega chose to use NEC's PowerVR chipset for its game console, though it still planned to purchase the rights to 3dfx's technology in order to prevent competitors from acquiring it.

3dfx said Sega has still not given a reason as to why it terminated the contract or why it chose NEC's accelerator chipset over 3dfx's. According to Dale Ford, senior analyst at Dataquest, a market research firm based in San Jose, California, a number of factors could have influenced Sega's decision to move to NEC, including NEC's proven track record of supplying chipsets for the Nintendo 64 and the demonstrated ability to be able to handle a major influx of capacity if the company decided to ramp up production on a moment's notice.

"This is a highly competitive market with price wars happening all the time and it would appear that after evaluating a number of choices—and the ramifications each choice brings—Sega went with a decision that it thought was best for the company's longevity," said Mr. Ford.

"Sega has to make a significant move to stay competitive and they need to make it soon. Now whether this move is to roll out another home console platform or move strictly to the PC gaming space is unknown."

Sega quickly quashed 3dfx's "Blackbelt" and used the NEC-based "Katana" as the model for the product that would be marketed and sold as the Dreamcast. 3dfx sued Sega for breach of contract, accusing Sega of starting the deal in bad faith in order to take 3dfx technology. The case was settled out of court.

=== New chips, competition, and decline ===
==== Development of Rampage ====
In early 1998, 3dfx embarked on a new development project. The Rampage development project was new technology for use in a new graphics card that would take approximately two years to develop, and would supposedly be several years ahead of the competition once it debuted. The company hired hardware and software teams in Austin, Texas, to develop 2D and 3D Windows device drivers for Rampage in the summer of 1998. The hardware team in Austin initially focused on Rampage, but then worked on transform and lighting (T&L) engines and on MPEG decoder technology.

==== Acquisition of STB ====
3dfx announced in January 1999 that its Banshee cards had sold about one million units. While Nvidia had yet to launch a product in the add-in board market that sold as well as 3dfx's Voodoo line, the company was gaining steady ground in the OEM market. The Nvidia RIVA TNT was a similar, highly integrated product that had two major advantages in greater 3D speed and 32-bit 3D color support. 3dfx, by contrast, had very limited OEM sales, as the Banshee was adopted only in small numbers by OEMs.

3dfx executed a major strategy change just prior to the launch of Voodoo3 by purchasing STB Systems for US$141 million on December 14, 1998. STB Systems was one of the larger graphics card manufacturers at the time; the intent was for 3dfx to start manufacturing, marketing, and selling its own graphics cards, rather than functioning only as an OEM supplier. Purchase of STB was intended to give 3dfx access to that company's considerable OEM resources and sales channels, but the intended benefits of the acquisition never materialized. The two corporations were vastly different entities, with different cultures and structures, and they never integrated smoothly.

STB prior to the 3dfx acquisition also approached Nvidia as a potential partner to acquire the company. At the time, STB was Nvidia's largest customer and was only minimally engaged with 3dfx. 3dfx management mistakenly believed that acquiring STB would ensure OEM design wins with their products and that product limitations would be overcome with STB's knowledge in supporting the OEM sales/design win cycles. Nvidia decided not to acquire STB and to continue to support many brands of graphics board manufacturers. After STB was acquired by 3dfx, Nvidia focused on being a virtual graphics card manufacturer for the OEMs and strengthened its position in selling finished reference designs ready for market to the OEMs. STB's manufacturing facility in Juarez, Mexico was not able to compete from either a cost or quality point of view when compared to the burgeoning original design manufacturers (ODMs) and Contract electronic manufacturers (CEMs) that were delivering solutions in Asia for Nvidia. Prior to the STB merger finalizing, some of 3dfx's OEMs warned the company that any product from Juarez will not be deemed fit to ship with their systems, however 3dfx management believed these problems could be addressed over time. Those customers generally became Nvidia customers and no longer chose to ship 3dfx products.

The acquisition of STB was one of the main contributors to 3dfx's downfall; the Voodoo 3 became the first 3dfx card to be developed in-house rather than by third-party manufacturers, which were a significant source of revenue for the company. These third-party manufacturers turned into competitors and began sourcing graphics chips from Nvidia. This also further alienated 3dfx's remaining OEM customers, as they had a single source for 3dfx products and could not choose an OEM to provide cost flexibility. With the purchase of STB, 3dfx created two cards targeting the low-end market, the Velocity 100, which has 8 MB of SDRAM, and the Velocity 200, which has 16 MB of SGRAM. The cards both used a chipset based on the Voodoo3 2000, and it was claimed that they were "underclocked". However, it was revealed by testing that the Velocity 100 chipset has the same clock speed as a typical Voodoo3 2000—at 143 MHz—and that, while one of its two TMUs is disabled in OpenGL and Glide applications for memory management, it can be re-enabled to increase those applications' performance, and AnandTech found no side effects of enabling the component.

As 3dfx focused more on the retail graphics card space, further inroads into the OEM space were limited. A significant requirement of the OEM business was the ability to consistently produce new products on the six-month product refresh cycle the computer manufacturers required; 3dfx did not have the methodology nor the mindset to focus on this business model. In the end, 3dfx opted to be a retail distribution company manufacturing their own branded products.

==== Delays ====
The company's final product was code-named Napalm. Originally, this was just a Voodoo3 modified to support newer technologies and higher clock speeds, with performance estimated to be around the level of the RIVA TNT2. However, Napalm was delayed, and in the meantime Nvidia brought out their landmark GeForce 256 chip, which shifted even more of the computational work from the CPU to the graphics chip. Napalm would have been unable to compete with the GeForce, so it was redesigned to support multiple chip configurations, like the Voodoo2 had. The end-product was named VSA-100, with VSA standing for Voodoo Scalable Architecture. 3dfx was finally able to have a product that could defeat the GeForce.

However, by the time the VSA-100 based cards made it to the market, the GeForce 2 and ATI Radeon cards had arrived and were offering higher performance for the same price. The only real advantage the Voodoo 5 5500 had over the GeForce 2 GTS or Radeon was its superior spatial anti-aliasing implementation, and the fact that, relative to its peers, it did not suffer such a large performance hit when anti-aliasing was enabled. 3dfx was fully aware of the Voodoo 5's speed deficiency, so they touted it as quality over speed, which was a reversal of the Voodoo 3 marketing which emphasized raw performance over features. 5500 sales were respectable but volumes were not at a level to keep 3dfx afloat.

==== GigaPixel and insolvency ====
On March 28, 2000, 3dfx bought GigaPixel for US$186 million, in order to help launch its Rampage product to market quicker. GigaPixel had previously almost won the contract to build Microsoft's Xbox console, but lost out to Nvidia.

However, in late 2000, not long after the launch of the Voodoo 4, several of 3dfx's creditors decided to initiate bankruptcy proceedings. 3dfx, as a whole, would have had virtually no chance of successfully contesting these proceedings, and instead opted to sell its assets to Nvidia, effectively ceasing to exist as a company. The resolution and legality of those arrangements (with respect to the purchase, 3dfx's creditors and its bankruptcy proceedings) took over a decade to resolve in the federal courts. Specifically, the trustee of 3dfx's bankruptcy estate challenged 3dfx's sale of its assets to Nvidia as an allegedly fraudulent conveyance. On November 6, 2014, in an unpublished memorandum order, the U.S. Court of Appeals for the Ninth Circuit affirmed the "district court's judgment affirming the bankruptcy court's determination that [Nvidia] did not pay less than fair market value for assets purchased from 3dfx shortly before 3dfx filed for bankruptcy".

A majority of the engineering and design team working on Rampage/Sage who remained with the transition, were requested and remained in house to work on what became the GeForce FX series. Others accepted employment with ATI to bring their knowledge to the creation of the X series of video cards and the development of Crossfire, their own version of SLI.

The prototype Spectre 1000 cards were delivered to software developers mere days before declaring insolvency. The software team developed both device drivers and a binary-compatible soft emulation of the Rampage function set. Thus, there were working Windows NT device drivers within a few days of the power on of the Rampage system on the 2nd week of December, 2000. At the time of Nvidia's acquisition, 3dfx had already been developing the successors to Spectre. "Fear", based on a next-generation Rampage called Fusion, and Sage2. "Mojo" would combine both into a single die, implement tiled rendering, and showcase some advanced technologies from the GigaPixel acquisition. The unreleased Spectre 1000 card, based on Rampage, would eventually be leaked and tested. Performance indicated that it would have struggled to compete with Nvidia's already-released GeForce 256, though the theoretical Spectre 2000 and Spectre 3000 cards, which featured a combination of Rampage and Sage units, would have led the market until late 2002, with Nvidia's GeForce 4 series.

After Nvidia acquired 3dfx's intellectual property, they announced that they would not provide technical support for 3dfx products. As of 2019, drivers and support are still offered by community websites. However, while functional, the drivers do not carry a manufacturer's backing and are considered beta software. For a limited time, Nvidia offered a program under which 3dfx owners could trade in their cards for Nvidia cards of similar performance. On December 15, 2000, 3dfx apologized to the customers with a final press release. In 2003, the source code for 3dfx drivers leaked, resulting in fan-made, updated drivers and further support.

Although 1997 was marked by analysts as a turning point for 3dfx due to the marketing led by the new CEO Greg Ballard, there was criticism of Ballard's understanding of R&D in the graphics industry. Single-card 2D/3D solutions were taking over the market, and although Ballard saw the need and attempted to direct the company there with the Voodoo Banshee and the Voodoo3, both of these cost the company millions in sales and lost market share while diverting vital resources from the Rampage project. Then 3dfx released word in early 1999 that the still-competitive Voodoo2 would support only OpenGL and Glide under Microsoft's Windows 2000 operating system, and not Direct3D. Many games were transitioning to Direct3D at this point, and the announcement caused many PC players – the core demographic of 3dfx's market – to switch to Nvidia or ATI offerings for their new machines. Ballard resigned shortly after, in January 2000.

== Product development history ==
=== Voodoo Graphics PCI ===
A typical Voodoo Graphics PCI expansion card consisted of a DAC, a frame buffer processor and a texture mapping unit, along with 4 MB of EDO DRAM. The RAM and graphics processors operated at 50 MHz. It provided only 3D acceleration and as such the computer also needed a traditional video controller for conventional 2D software. A pass-through VGA cable daisy-chained the video controller to the Voodoo, which was itself connected to the monitor. The method used to engage the Voodoo's output circuitry varied between cards, with some using mechanical relays while others utilized purely solid-state components. The mechanical relays emitted an audible "clicking" sound when they engaged and disengaged.

=== Voodoo Rush ===
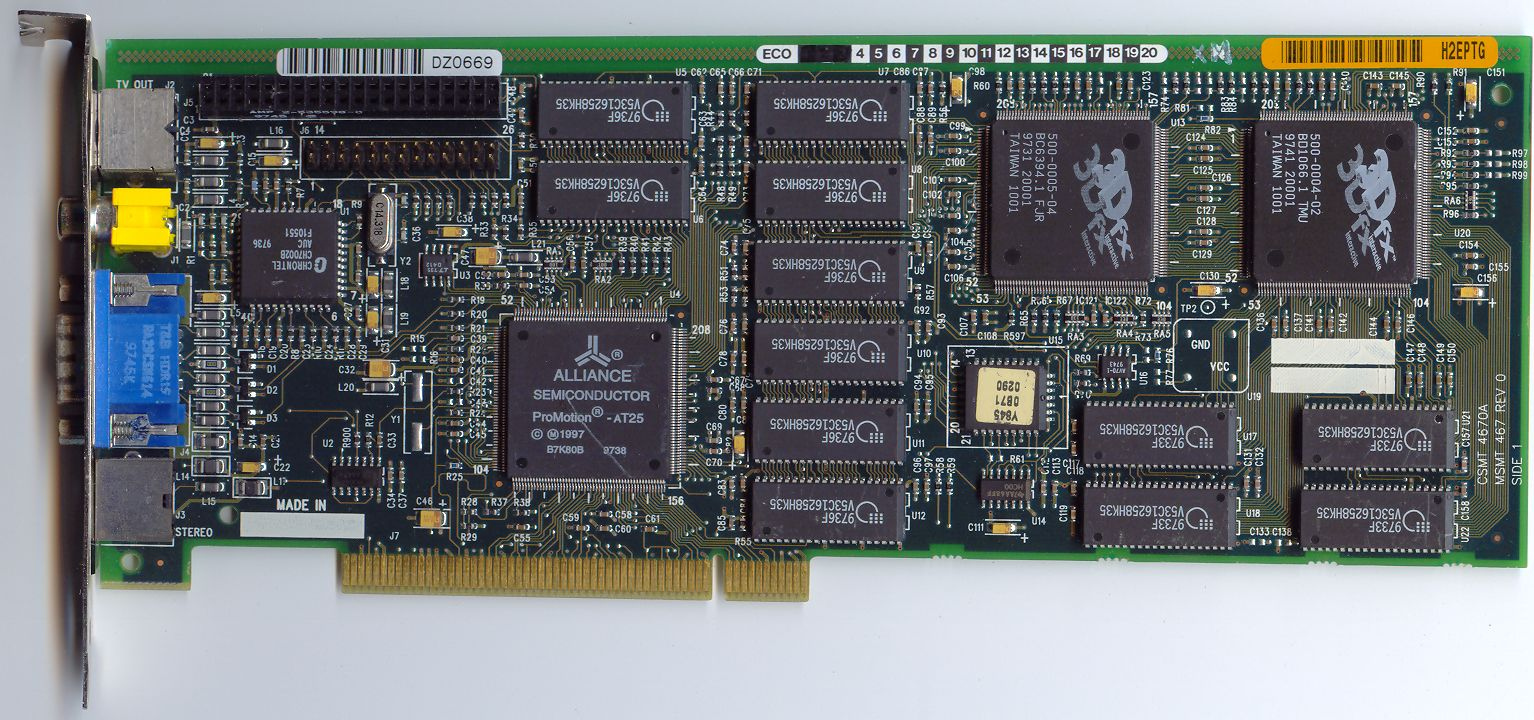
Intergraph Intense3D Voodoo

In August 1997, 3dfx released the Voodoo Rush chipset, combining a Voodoo chip with a 2D chip that lay on the same circuit board, eliminating the need for a separate VGA card. Most cards were built with an Alliance Semiconductor AT25/AT3D 2D component, but there were some built with a Macronix chip and there were initial plans to partner with Trident but no such boards were ever marketed.

The Rush had the same specifications as Voodoo Graphics, but did not perform as well because the Rush chipset had to share memory bandwidth with the CRTC of the 2D chip. Furthermore, the Rush chipset was not directly present on the PCI bus but had to be programmed through linked registers of the 2D chip. Like the Voodoo Graphics, there was no interrupt mechanism, so the driver had to poll the Rush in order to determine whether a command had completed or not; the indirection through the 2D component added significant overhead here and tended to back up traffic on the PCI interface. The typical performance hit was around 10% compared to Voodoo Graphics, and even worse in windowed mode. Later, Rush boards were released by Hercules featuring 8 MiB VRAM and a 10% higher clock speed, in an attempt to close this performance gap.

Some manufacturers bundled a PC version of Atari Games' racing game San Francisco Rush, the arcade version of which utilised a slightly upgraded Voodoo Graphics chipset with an extra texture mapping unit and additional texture memory.

The Voodoo Rush was 3dfx's first commercial failure. Sales were very poor, and the cards were discontinued within a year.

=== Voodoo2 ===
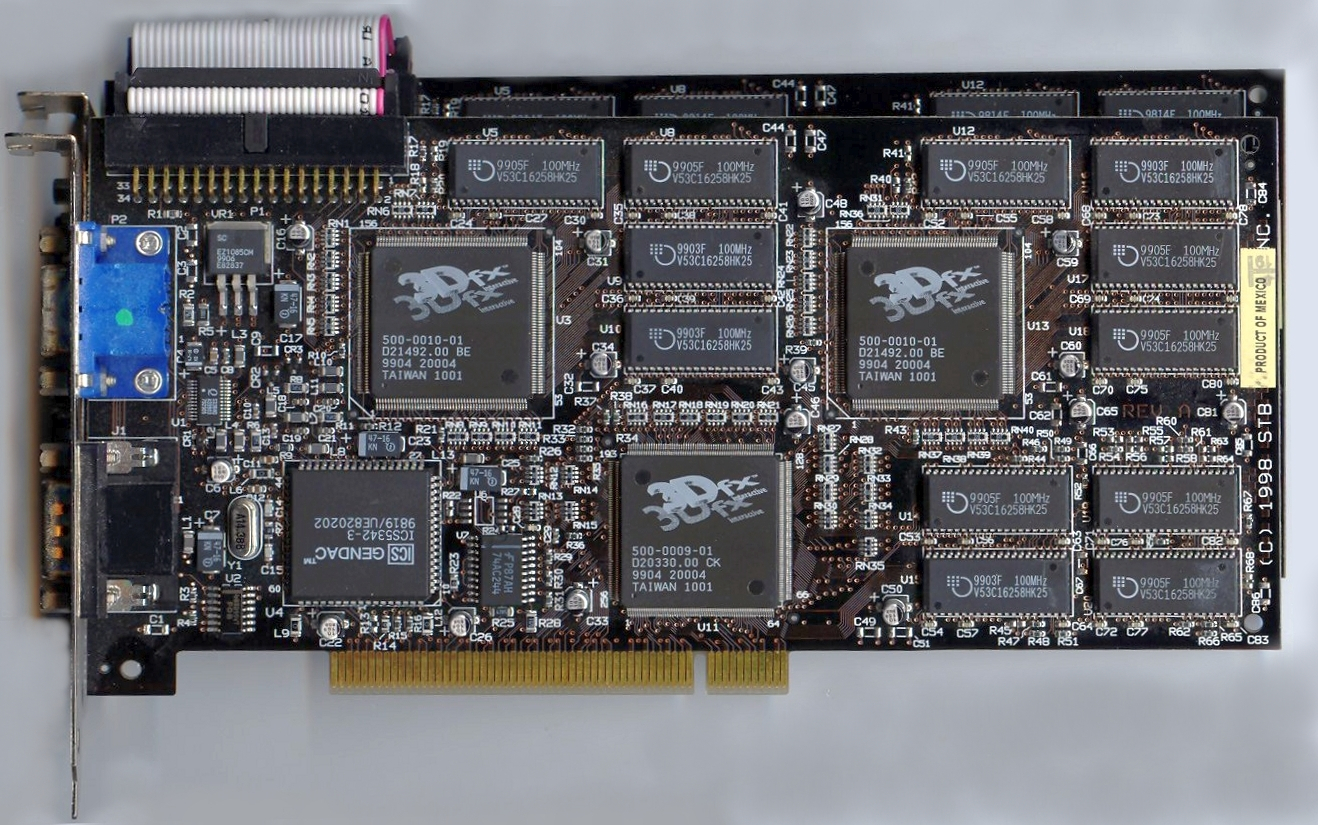
STB Systems Blackmagic 3D in SLI

The 3dfx Voodoo2, the successor to the Voodoo Graphics chipset released in February 1998, was architecturally similar, but the basic board configuration added a second texturing unit, allowing two textures to be drawn in a single pass.

The Voodoo2 required three chips and a separate VGA graphics card, whereas new competing 3D products, such as the ATI Rage Pro, Nvidia RIVA 128, and Rendition Verite 2200, were single-chip products. Despite some shortcomings, such as the card's dithered 16-bit 3D color rendering and 800x600 resolution limitations, no other manufacturers' products could match the smooth framerates that the Voodoo2 produced. It was a landmark (and expensive) achievement in PC 3D-graphics. Its excellent performance, and the mindshare gained from the original Voodoo Graphics, resulted in its success. Many users even preferred Voodoo2's dedicated purpose, because they were free to use the quality 2D card of their choice as a result. Some 2D/3D cards at the time offered quite sub-par 2D quality and speed.

The Voodoo2 introduced Scan-Line Interleave (SLI), in which two Voodoo2 boards were connected together, each drawing half the scan lines of the screen. SLI increased the maximum resolution supported to 1024×768. Because of the high cost and inconvenience of using three separate graphics cards (two Voodoo2 SLI plus the general purpose 2D graphics adapter), the Voodoo2 SLI scheme had minimal effect on total market share and was not a financial success. SLI capability was not offered in subsequent 3dfx board designs, although the technology would be later used to link the VSA-100 chips on the Voodoo 5.

The arrival of the Nvidia RIVA TNT with integrated 2D/3D chipset would offer minor challenge to the Voodoo2's supremacy months later.

=== Voodoo Banshee ===
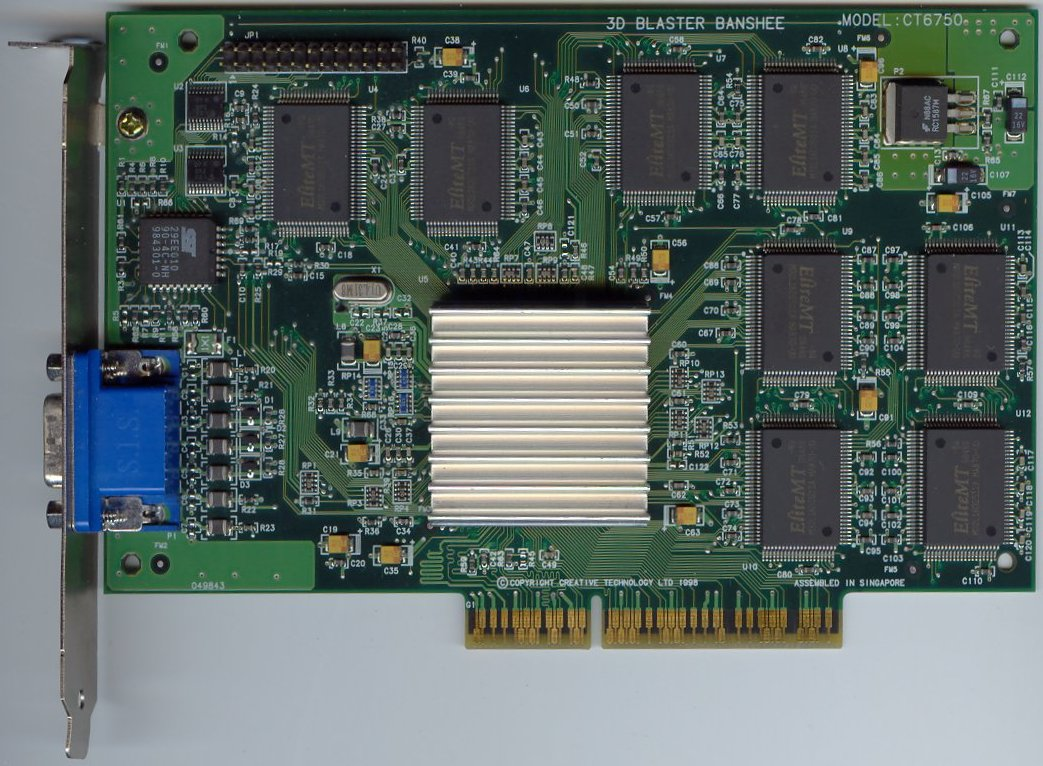
Creative 3D Blaster Banshee AGP

Near the end of 1998, 3dfx released the Voodoo Banshee, which featured a lower price achieved through higher component integration, and a more complete feature-set including 2D acceleration, to target the mainstream consumer market. A single-chip solution, the Banshee was a combination of a 2D video card and partial (only one texture mapping unit) Voodoo2 3D hardware. Due to the missing second TMU, in 3D scenes which used multiple textures per polygon, the Voodoo2 was significantly faster. However, in scenes dominated by single-textured polygons, the Banshee could match or exceed the Voodoo2 due to its higher clock speed and resulting greater pixel fillrate.

Banshee's 2D acceleration was the first such hardware from 3dfx and it was very capable. It rivaled the fastest 2D cores from Matrox, Nvidia, and ATI. It consisted of a 128-bit 2D GUI engine and a 128-bit VESA VBE 3.0 VGA core. The graphics chip capably accelerated DirectDraw and supported all of the Windows Graphics Device Interface (GDI) in hardware, with all 256 raster operations and tertiary functions, and hardware polygon acceleration. The 2D core achieved near-theoretical maximum performance with a null driver test in Windows NT.

Voodoo Banshee supports MPEG2 video acceleration.

=== Voodoo3 ===
The Voodoo 3 was hyped as the graphics card that would make 3dfx the undisputed leader, but the actual product was below expectations. Though it was still the fastest as it edged the RIVA TNT2 by a small margin, the Voodoo3 lacked 32-bit color and large texture support. Though at that time few games supported large textures and 32-bit color, and those that did generally were too demanding to be run at playable framerates, the features "32-bit color support" and "2048×2048 textures" were much more impressive on paper than 16-bit color and 256×256 texture support. The Voodoo3 sold relatively well, but was disappointing compared to the first two models and 3dfx lost the market leadership to Nvidia.

As 3dfx attempted to counter the TNT2 threat, it was surprised by Nvidia's GeForce 256. The GeForce was a single-chip processor with integrated transform, lighting, triangle setup/clipping (hardware T&L), and rendering engines, giving it a significant performance advantage over the Voodoo3. The 3dfx Voodoo3 2000 PCI was the highest-performance 2D/3D card available for the Apple Macintosh at the time of its release, though support from 3dfx was labeled as 'beta' and required a firmware reflash. As game developers switched to DirectX and OpenGL, which respectively had become the industry standard and were becoming increasingly popular, 3dfx released its Glide API under the General Public License on December 6, 1999.

=== Voodoo 4 & 5 ===
The Voodoo 5 5000, which had 32 MB of VRAM to the 5500's 64 MB, was never released.

The only other member of the Voodoo 5 line, the Voodoo 4 4500, was as much of a disaster as Voodoo Rush, because it had performance well short of its value-oriented peers combined with a late launch. Voodoo 4 was beaten in almost all areas by the GeForce 2 MX—a low-cost board sold mostly as an OEM part for computer manufacturers—and the Radeon VE.

One unusual trait of the Voodoo 4 and 5 was that the Macintosh versions of these cards had both VGA and DVI output jacks, whereas the PC versions had only the VGA connector. Also, the Mac versions of the Voodoo 4 and 5 had a weakness in that they did not support hardware-based MPEG2 decode acceleration, which hindered the playback of DVDs on a Mac equipped with a Voodoo graphics card.

The Voodoo 5 6000 never made it to market, due to a severe bug resulting in data corruption on the AGP bus on certain boards, and was limited to AGP 2x. It was thus incompatible with the new Pentium 4 motherboards. Only a few more than one thousand units of the graphics card were ever produced. Later tests proved that the Voodoo 5 6000 outperformed not only the GeForce 2 GTS and ATI Radeon 7200, but also the faster GeForce 2 Ultra and Radeon 7500. In some cases it was shown to compete well with the GeForce 3, trading performance places with the card on various tests. However, the prohibitively high production cost of the card, particularly the 4 chip setup, external power supply and 128 MB of VRAM (which would have made it the first consumer card with that amount of memory), would have likely hampered its competitiveness.

== Products ==
Model	Launch	Code name	VGA^{1}	Fab (nm)	Bus interface	Memory (MB)	Core clock (MHz)	Memory clock (MHz)	Core config^{2}	Fillrate				Memory			Direct3D support
Model	Launch	Code name	VGA^{1}	Fab (nm)	Bus interface	Memory (MB)	Core clock (MHz)	Memory clock (MHz)	Core config^{2}	MOperations/s	MPixels/s	MTexels/s	MVertices/s	Bandwidth (GB/s)	Bus type	Bus width (bit)	Direct3D support
Voodoo Graphics	October 7, 1996	SST1	add-on	500	PCI	4, 6, 8	50	50	1:1	50	50	50	0	0.8	EDO	128	3.0
Voodoo Rush	April 1997	SST96	✓	500	PCI	4, 6, 8	50	50	1:1	50	50	50	0	0.4	EDO	64	3.0
Voodoo2	March 1, 1998	SST2	add-on	350	PCI	8, 12	90	90	2:1	90	90	180	0	2.16	EDO	192	5.0
Voodoo Banshee	June 22, 1998	Banshee	✓	350	AGP, PCI	8, 16	100	100	1:1	100	100	100	0	1.6	SDR	128	6.0
Velocity 100	July 26, 1999	Avenger	✓	250	AGP 2x	8	143	143	2:1	143	143	286	0	2.288	SDR	128	6.0
Velocity 200	Never released	Avenger	✓	250	AGP 2x	16	143	143	2:1	143	143	286	0	2.288	SDR	128	6.0
Voodoo3 1000	March 1999	Avenger	✓	250	AGP 2x	8, 16	125, 143	125, 143	2:1	125	125	250	0	2, 2.288	SDR	128	6.0
Voodoo3 2000	April 7, 1999	Avenger	✓	250	AGP 2x, PCI	16	143	143	2:1	143	143	286	0	2.288	SDR	128	6.0
Voodoo3 3000	April 7, 1999	Avenger	✓	250	AGP 2x, PCI	16	166	166	2:1	166	166	333	0	2.66	SDR	128	6.0
Voodoo3 3500 TVsi	April 7, 1999	Avenger	✓	250	AGP 2x	16	166	166	2:1	166	166	333	0	2.66	SDR	128	6.0
Voodoo3 3500 TV	June 1999	Avenger	✓	250	AGP 2x	16	183	183	2:1	183	183	366	0	2.928	SDR	128	6.0
Voodoo3 3500 TV SE	June 1999	Avenger	✓	250	AGP 2x	16	200	200	2:1	200	200	400	0	3.19	SDR	128	6.0
Voodoo4 4000	Never released	VSA-100	✓	250	AGP 4x, PCI	16	166	166	2:2	332	332	332	0	2.656	SDR	128	6.0
Voodoo4-2 4000	Never released	VSA-101	✓	180	AGP	16	?	?	2:2	?	?	?	0	?	SDR	128	6.0
Voodoo4-2 4200	Never released	VSA-101	✓	180	AGP, PCI	16, 32	143	143	2:2	143	143	?	0	?	DDR	64	6.0
Voodoo4-2 4200	Never released	VSA-101	✓	180	PCI	32	166	166	2:2	166	166	?	0	?	DDR	64	6.0
Voodoo4 4500	October 13, 2000	VSA-100	✓	250	AGP 2x/4x, PCI	32	166	166	2:2	332	332	332	0	2.656	SDR	128	6.0
Voodoo4 4800	Never released	VSA-100	✓	250	AGP 4x, PCI	64	166	166	2:2	333	333	333	0	2.656	SDR	128	6.0
Voodoo5 5000	Never released	VSA-100 x2	✓	250	AGP 4x, PCI	32	166	166	2:2 x2	664	664	664	0	2.656	SDR	128	6.0
Voodoo5 5500	June 22, 2000	VSA-100 x2	✓	250	AGP 2x, PCI	64	166	166	2:2 x2	664	664	664	0	5.33	SDR	128	6.0
Voodoo5 6000	Never released	VSA-100 x4	✓	250	AGP 4x, PCI	128	166	166	2:2 x4	1328	1328	1328	0	10.66	SDR	256	6.0
Spectre 1000	Never released	Rampage	✓	180	AGP 4x	64	200	400	4:4	800	800	800	0	6.4	DDR	128	7.0
Spectre 2000	Never released	Rampage + Sage	✓	180	AGP 4x	64	200	400	4:4	800	800	800	0	6.4	DDR	128	7.0
Spectre 3000	Never released	Rampage x2 + Sage	✓	180	AGP 4x	128	200	400	4:4 x2	1600	1600	1600	0	12.8	DDR	256	7.0

- ^{1} VGA: Whether the card included a built-in VGA subsystem and ran as a standalone graphics card
- ^{2} Texture mapping units:render output units – 3Dfx Velocity cards only have 1 working TMU enabled on OpenGL and Glide games, but both TMUs working under DirectX games.
