= In a Pickle (card game) =

Card and word game

The What's in a Word Game
- Designers: Colleen McCarthy-Evans and Joyce Johnson
- Illustrators: David Semple
- Publishers: Gamewright
- Players: 2 to 6
- Setup time: over 5 hours
- Playing time: 60 minutes
- Chance: high
- Age range: 10 and up
- Skills: creative thinking

In a Pickle is a card and word game for two to six players. It was published by Gamewright in 2004.

== Gameplay ==
In a Pickle contains 320 cards, each displaying a noun. To start the game, each player is dealt five cards, and four cards are placed face up in the shape of a "plus" sign in the center of the table. On their turn, a player may take a card from their hand and place it under or on top of one of the four piles in the center of the table. If the player places their card on top of the pile, the object represented by the noun on their card must be larger than the card it is placed over (for example, "oven" may be placed on top of "pie"). If the player places their card beneath the pile, the object on their card must fit inside the object it is placed under (for example, "person" may be placed beneath "car"). A card may not be placed between two cards, as it must be placed either on top of the entire pile or underneath the entire pile. After placing a card on top of or underneath a pile, the player then draws a card from the stack of unused cards to replenish their hand. The rule book encourages players to be creative when placing cards; one possible creative play is to place "universe" beneath "dictionary", as the word "universe" can be found in a dictionary. If a player cannot or chooses not to play a card, they may exchange up to three cards from their hand for the same number of cards from the pile of unused cards before ending their turn.

== Pickle round ==
Once the fourth card is placed in any of the four stacks, a "pickle round" begins. Starting with the player to the left of the player who placed the fourth card and going clockwise, each player gets one chance to play a card on top of the stack in question. Cards may not be played beneath this stack, and cards may not be played on or under any stack other than the stack with four cards. The player who has played the last card on the stack once the pickle round ends "wins" the stack and places it next to themself. Once a player wins a certain number of stacks, they win the game. The number of stacks required to win the game is:

Number of Players	Number of Stacks to Win
2 players	5 stacks
3 or 4 players	4 stacks
5 or 6 players	3 stacks

After the pickle round ends, a card is drawn from the stack of unused cards to start a new stack, ensuring that there are always four playable stacks. The player to the left of the player who started the pickle round takes the next turn to resume normal play.

== Alternate gameplay ==
Under normal rules, each card played is only required to relate to the card that it touches. However, when playing with alternate rules, each card must relate to all the cards in the stack. For example, normal rules would allow the sequence lawyer-pickle-jar, because a lawyer could be in a pickle (in a manner of speaking) and a pickle can fit in a jar, but the alternate rules would not allow this because a lawyer cannot fit in a jar, unless the lawyer has been cremated first or the jar is exceptionally large, in which case the above sequence would be allowed by the alternate rules.
