= Rush 2: Extreme Racing USA =

1998 video game

- North American box art
- Developer: Atari Games
- Publishers: NA: Midway; PAL: GT Interactive
- Designer: Ed Logg
- Programmers: Ed Logg; Mike Kelly; Mike Alexander
- Artist: Jose Erazo
- Composer: Barry Leitch
- Series: Rush
- Platform: Nintendo 64
- Release: NA: November 11, 1998; PAL: February 4, 1999
- Genre: Racing
- Modes: Single-player, multiplayer

Rush 2: Extreme Racing USA is a 1998 racing video game developed by Atari Games and published by Midway exclusively for the Nintendo 64. It is the second game in the Rush series.

== Gameplay ==
The game is notable for the high level of detail in the recreations of the various cities and states used, and for its fast arcade-style physics. The game features a two-player mode and Rumble Pak support. Hidden shortcuts and jumps add to the replay value of the game.

Mountain Dew soda cans appear in the game and can be collected to unlock content.

== Reception ==
Reception

Aggregate score
Aggregator	Score
GameRankings	78%

Review scores
Publication	Score
CNET Gamecenter	7/10
Consoles +	83%
Electronic Gaming Monthly	6.875/10 (Note: Four critics of Electronic Gaming Monthly gave the game each a score of 8/10, 4.5/10, 6.5/10, and 8.5/10.)
EP Daily	9/10
Game Informer	8.75/10
GameRevolution	C−
GameSpot	5.1/10
Hyper	85%
IGN	8.9/10
N64 Magazine	75%
Next Generation	4/5
Nintendo Power	7.3/10

The game received favorable reviews according to the review aggregation website GameRankings. IGN called the game "a bit on the cheesy side" despite criticism with the presentation and stated that it had "generic menus and the same overall front-end" as San Francisco Rush: Extreme Racing. Next Generation called it "a worthy successor to the original." GamePro said that the game "packs in enough quality racing to satisfy even the most jaded gamer. All the changes and updates seem minor when taken individually, but they add up to a satisfying new whole. Rush 2 is well worth its price." (Note: GamePro gave the game three 4.5/5 scores for graphics, control, and fun factor, and 4/5 for sound.)
