= Glide (API) =

3D graphics API developed by 3dfx Interactive

- Original author: 3dfx Interactive
- Stable release: 3.10.00.30303 / September 2, 2003; 23 years ago
- Written in: Assembly, C
- Operating system: Cross-platform
- Type: 3D graphics API
- License: GNU General Public License; 3DFX GLIDE Source Code General Public License
- Website: sourceforge.net/projects/glide/

Glide is a 3D graphics API developed by 3dfx Interactive for their Voodoo Graphics 3D accelerator cards. It started as a proprietary API but was later open-sourced. It was dedicated to rendering performance, supporting geometry and texture mapping primarily, in data formats identical to those used internally in their cards. Wide adoption of 3Dfx led to Glide being extensively used in the late 1990s, but further refinement of Microsoft's Direct3D and the appearance of full OpenGL implementations from other graphics card vendors, in addition to growing diversity in 3D hardware, eventually caused it to become obsolete.

== Glide wrappers and emulators ==
Glide emulator development has been in progress since the late 1990s. During 3dfx's lifetime, the company was aggressive at trying to stop these attempts to emulate their proprietary API, shutting down early emulation projects with legal threats. However, just before it ceased operations and had its assets purchased by Nvidia, 3dfx released the Glide API, along with the Voodoo 2 and Voodoo 3 specifications, under an open-source license, which later evolved into an open-source project.

== See also ==
- Vulkan (API)
- 3dfx Interactive
- MiniGL
- Mantle (API) – another low-level API
