= L.A. Rush =

2005 video game

- North American cover art featuring the 1967 Chevrolet Camaro SS, with a Mitsubishi Lancer Evolution VIII smashing through the Hollywood Sign in the background
- Developers: Midway Studios Newcastle; Rockpool Games (mobile)
- Publishers: Midway; Zoo Digital Publishing (PC); Farside Games (mobile)
- Producer: Tony Parkes
- Programmer: John Blackburne
- Artist: Stewart Neal
- Series: Rush
- Platforms: PlayStation 2, Xbox, Windows, PlayStation Portable
- Release: PlayStation 2, Xbox: NA: 10 October 2005; EU: 21 October 2005; Windows: NA: 1 February 2006; EU: 28 April 2006; PlayStation Portable: NA: 7 November 2006; EU: 17 November 2006
- Genre: Racing
- Modes: Single-player, multiplayer

L.A. Rush is a 2005 racing video game developed by Midway Studios Newcastle and published by Midway for PlayStation 2 and Xbox. In 2006, it was ported to Microsoft Windows, and later the PlayStation Portable as simply titled Rush. A Gizmondo port was planned, but ultimately cancelled on 6 February 2006, due to the discontinuation of the console.

Serving as the fourth and final instalment in the Rush series, L.A. Rush introduced several new elements to the franchise, including an open-world gameplay, licensed vehicles, and a comprehensive storyline. Unlike its previous installments, which were set in the city of San Francisco, L.A. Rush takes place in Los Angeles, hence to its title, which players race through condensed re-creations of parts of L.A., including Beverly Hills, Hollywood, Santa Monica, South Central, South Bay and Downtown L.A., with some places and landmarks were also reproduced such as the Los Angeles International Airport (LAX) and the Hollywood Sign. The game's storyline features voice likeness from Luis Da Silva, Orlando Jones, Bill Bellamy, André 3000 and Twista – the latter also contributed the game's soundtrack.

The game was produced and funded by endorsement from MTV through the MTV Games unit.

The game received mixed reviews from critics. The Xbox version had the ability to download car skins via Xbox Live. L.A Rush is now supported on Insignia, a revival server restoring online functionality for original Xbox Games. The Xbox version is not compatible with Xbox 360.

== Gameplay ==
The game features free-roaming with race mechanics similar to those in Need for Speed: Underground 2. The GPS map can have a point assigned to a certain location and then the point shows up on the minimap during gameplay. It also features two mission types and two game modes. Other features include 50 vehicles, 30 different cruise missions (can be played with another player on the PSP version when connected to Wi-Fi), upgrades for cars (available from multiple top-line manufacturers and West Coast Customs) and a hip hop and rock soundtrack from various artists, such as Twista, Lil' Kim, Skinny Puppy, J-Kwon and Rock 'n Roll Soldiers.

There are two modes in the game; Battle mode (which was first introduced in the home version of Rush 2049) lets the players go head-to-head with each other in a power-up-propelled race, while the Stunt Arena mode (which was featured in all other home Rush games) is only available in the PSP version of the game, where the player must launch their car off the ramp and fly through the air performing different tricks. In order to keep up with points, the player must land their car safely on all four wheels.

Aside from two modes, there are two mission types available; the Reacquire missions involve the player recovering the cars that have been repossessed from the storyline and bringing them back to the garage with minimal damage, whilst avoiding enemy vehicles that try to ram the player. The Retribution missions involve property damage where the player is tasked to destroy various things that belonged to Lidell in different ways.

Up to 50 playable cars are featured in the game, 30 of which are licensed cars, while the rest are Midway concept cars.

== Plot ==
In Beverly Hills, street racer-turned entrepreneur Trikz Lane (Luis Da Silva) is hosting a night party at his mansion. He plans to commission West Coast Customs (Ryan Friedlinghaus, Quinton "Q" Dodson, Michael "Mad Mike" Martin and Dana "Big Dane" Florence) to modify his first racing car, a blue 1995 Nissan 240SX (S14), nicknamed the "go-kart", in an effort to be featured as a cover car for an upcoming issue of Rides magazine. Trikz crosses paths with a racing organiser who goes by the name of Lidell Rey (Bill Bellamy), who is despised and prevented the former from entering his organised racing series. Upon giving Trikz a warning that "changes are coming", Lidell drops pennies from his hat to Trikz.

While Trikz was away on his two-week holiday in Saint Barthélemy, Lidell hired a mortgage broker and repossessed Trikz's mansion entirely, including his car collection. Upon returning, a jealous Trikz finds his empty mansion and his abandoned S14. Supported by his friend, Ty Malix (Orlando Jones), Trikz heads to Hollywood and enters Lidell's racing series, the Lidell Rey Street Slam. As Trikz happens to be winning races there, Ty contracts him, informing that he has tracked down the first four repossessed cars, which Trikz recovers all of them despite have to outrun Lidell's henchmen. Ty also learns about Lidell's business, Lidell Corporation, and his associated properties across L.A., which he then contracts Ryan Friedlinghaus of West Coast Customs, where the latter sends Trikz to vandalise Lidell's properties.

Trikz heads to Santa Monica, winning races there, recovers more of his missing cars, and tears down the Pacific Wheel at Santa Monica Pier that's owned by Lidell. At the end of the first half of the stage, Lidell's girlfriend Lana secretly called Trikz and starts helping him track down some of his repossessed cars. Trikz continues to regain fame by completing races held in South Central and South Bay. While there, he and Ty visit West Coast Customs' Carson branch to find out about the progress of the S14 build. Trikz learns that Lidell has sent a street racer from another state (Twista) and received a shipment of high-tech luxury cars. Hired by Ryan once again, Trikz steals and destroys one of the cars by having it be smashed by a train.

Trikz and Ty confront Lidell and his hired unnamed racer in Downtown Los Angeles, which after a heated argument, the two offer them a large bet, which they accept. Regardless, Trikz keeps winning races across the Downtown area, recovers the last remaining cars, and vandalises Lidell's photo shoot location that was being held on the rooftop of a parking garage. Trikz and Lidell compete in a race across the entire Downtown area with Lidell's henchmen also being involved, with Trikz emerging victorious.

After restoring his wealth and reputation, Trikz starts dating Lana and takes a one-month break from street racing in favour of a holiday to Maui, Hawaii. Meanwhile, West Coast Customs unveils the finished build of Trikz's S14, where it has been modified to resemble a coupé utility featuring a Jacuzzi hot tub and a large TV on the back.

== Reception ==
Reception

Aggregate score
Aggregator	Score		
Aggregator	PS2	PSP	Xbox
Metacritic	58/100	55/100	59/100

Review scores
Publication	Score		
Publication	PS2	PSP	Xbox
1Up.com	C+	C-	C+
Game Informer	6.25/10		6.25/10
GameSpot			6.3/10
GameSpy	2/5	2/5	2/5
IGN	5.6/10	5.2/10	5.6/10
PlayStation: The Official Magazine	6.5/10		

The Xbox, PS2 and PSP versions received "mixed or average" reviews, according to the review aggregator website Metacritic.

Many reviewers have been critical of the game. One common criticism is that the ability to customise cars was poorly realised; players cannot modify them themselves, instead, the West Coast Customs crew automatically upgrades the car. GamesRadar says: "Roll your vehicle into the garage and they'll kit it out with what they feel like".

L.A. Rush has also been criticised for not including every area of Los Angeles; for example, the San Fernando Valley was excluded.

Not all reactions were negative. Some welcomed the realistic handling in the game as being comparable to the handling in Juiced (2005) and Need for Speed: Underground 2 (2004).

=== Nominations ===
Year	Result	Award	Category/Recipient(s)
2005	Nominated	Satellite Awards	Best Sports/Fighting/Racing Game
