= AMD 900 chipset series =

Series of chipsets by AMD

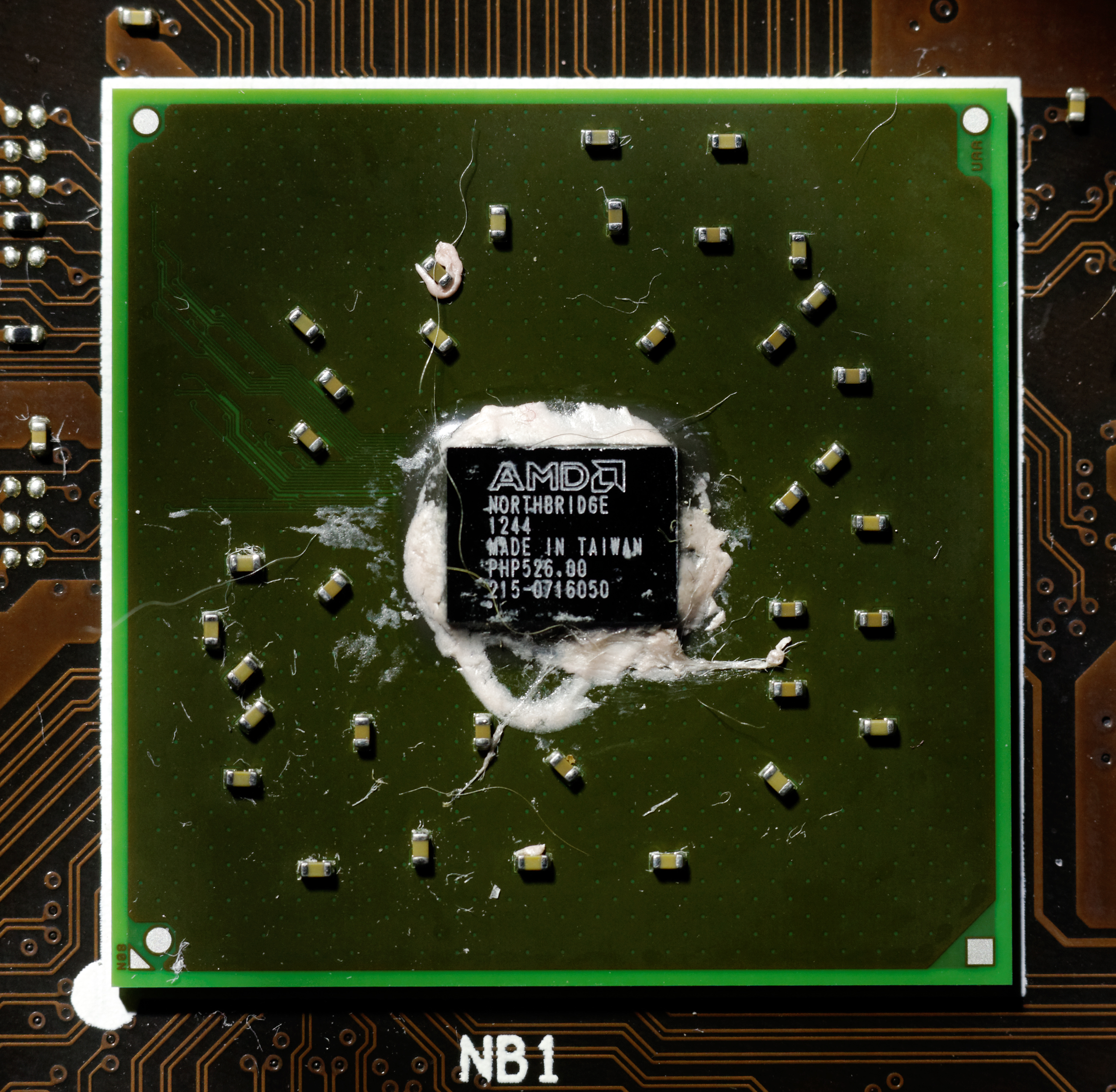
- Exposed die of an AMD 970 northbridge
- CPU supported: Opteron, FX, Phenom II, Athlon II, Sempron
- Socket supported: AM3+
- Southbridge: SB950, SB920

Desktop / mobile chipsets
- Enthusiast segment: 990FX
- Performance segment: 990X
- Mainstream segment: 970, 980G

Miscellaneous
- Release date: June 1, 2011
- IGP Direct3D support: 10.1 (980G)
- Predecessor: AMD 800 chipset series
- Successor: AMD 300 series chipset

The AMD 900 chipset series is identical to the AMD 800 chipset series except for the fact that it is only found on Socket AM3+ mainboards, whereas its predecessor is only found on Socket AM3 mainboards. It was released in 2011.

This allows consumers to easily identify the Socket through the chipset name. Socket AM3+ supports solely Bulldozer (microarchitecture)-based FX-processors.

In support of AM3+ CPUs, AMD has validated the 9-Series chipset for use with HyperTransport 3.1 (up to 6.4 GT/s). They also worked with NVIDIA to bring SLI support to this chipset series. AMD OverDrive is supported for simplified overclocking.

== Lineup ==
Common features of all chipsets in the 9xx series:

- Supports AM3+ and AM3 processors
- PCI Express 2.0
- IOMMU 1.26

=== 990FX ===
- Codenamed RD990
- Four physical PCIe 2.0 ×16 slots @ x8 electrical which can be combined to create two PCIe 2.0×16 slots @ x16 electrical, six PCIe 2.0×1 lanes in various combinations of 1x 2x or 4x slots, and an additional PCIe 2.0x4 slot that does not exist on the 990x or 970 the chipset provides a total of 42 PCIe 2.0 lanes and 4 PCIe 2.0 for A-Link Express III solely in the Northbridge
- HyperTransport 3.0 up to 5200 MT/s and PCI Express 2.0
- ATI CrossFireX supporting up to four graphics cards
- 19.6 Watt TDP
- Southbridge: SB950
- Enthusiast discrete multi-graphics segment

=== 990X ===
- Codenamed RD980
- One physical PCIe 2.0×16 slot or two physical PCIe 2.0×16 slots @ ×8, one PCIe 2.0×4 slot and two PCIe 2.0×1 slots, the chipset provides a total of 22 PCIe 2.0 lanes and 4 PCIe 2.0 for A-Link Express III solely in the Northbridge
- HyperTransport 3.0 up to 5200 MT/s and PCI Express 2.0
- Support for up to two graphics cards
- 14 Watt TDP
- Southbridge: SB950

=== 980G ===
(Identical to 880G)

- Codenamed RS880
- Single AMD processor configuration
- One physical PCIe 2.0 ×16 slot, one PCIe 2.0 ×4 slot and two PCIe 2.0 ×1 slots, the chipset provides a total of 22 PCIe 2.0 lanes and 4 PCIe 2.0 for A-Link Express III solely in the Northbridge
- Integrated graphics: Radeon HD 4250
  - Side-port memory as local framebuffer, supporting DDR3 modules up to DDR3-1333.
  - ATI PowerPlay 7.0 technology
- HyperTransport 3.0 and PCI Express 2.0
- ATI CrossFire
  - Hybrid CrossFireX

=== AMD 970 ===
- Codenamed RX980
- One physical PCIe 2.0 ×16 slot, one PCIe 2.0 ×4 slot and two PCIe 2.0 ×1 slots, the chipset provides a total of 22 PCIe 2.0 lanes and 4 PCIe 2.0 for A-Link Express III solely in the Northbridge
- HyperTransport 3.0 up to 4800 MT/s and PCI Express 2.0
- 13.6 Watt TDP
- Southbridge: SB950/SB920

== Southbridge ==
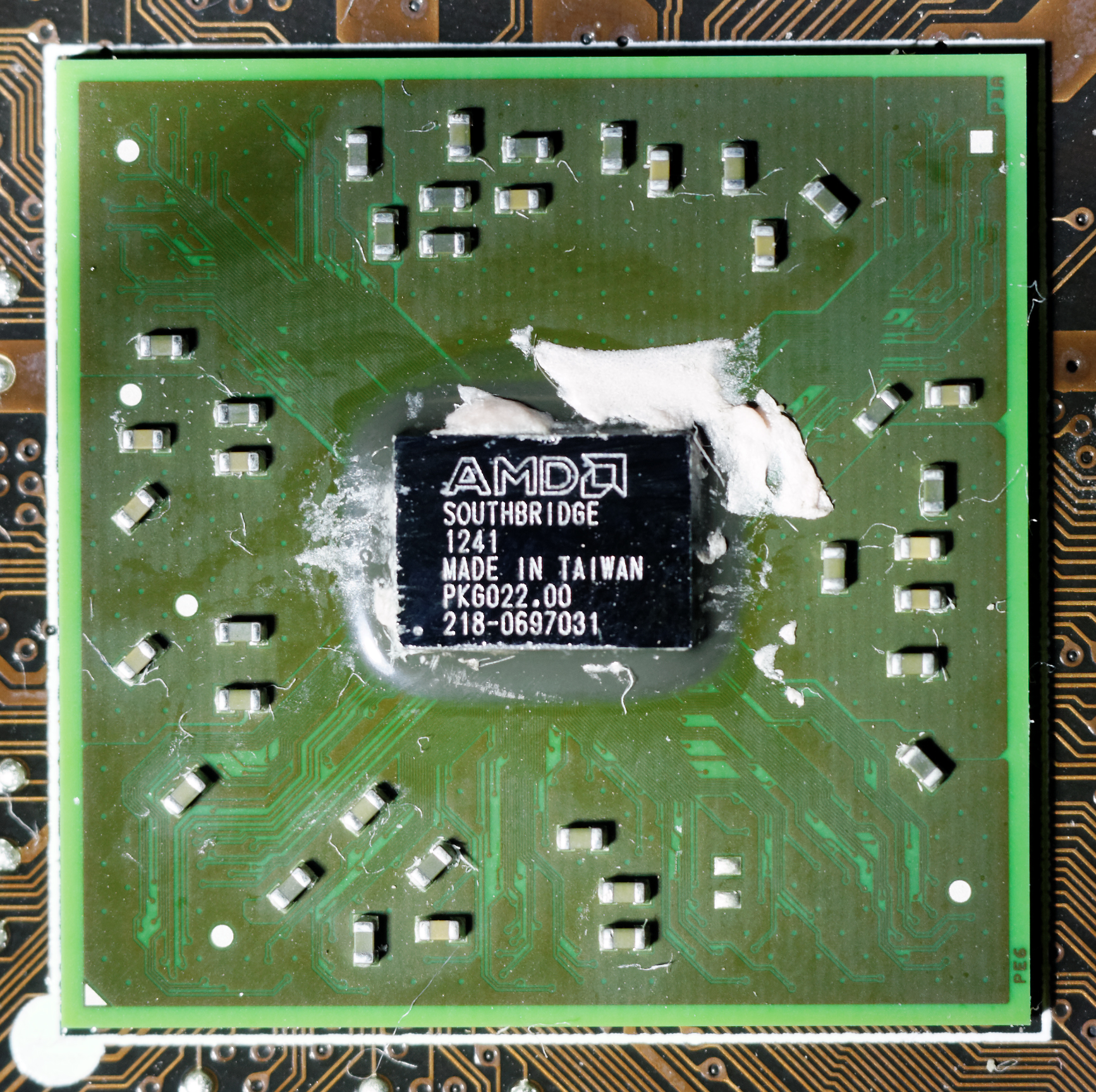
AMD SB950 southbridge

The SB950 is the companion southbridge that provides I/O support. It provides the following additional capabilities:

- 4× PCIe 2.0 lanes
- 14× USB 2.0 ports
- Conventional PCI bus
- 6× SATA III ports
- RAID 0, 1, 5, 10 support

There is also an SB920 southbridge available, which provides the following capabilities:

- 2× PCIe 2.0 lanes
- 14× USB 2.0 ports
- Conventional PCI bus
- 6× SATA III ports
- RAID 0, 1, 10 support

== Southbridge issues (SB9x0) ==
- Linux platform:
  - HPET operation with MSI causes LPC DMA corruption on devices using LPC DMA (floppy, parallel port, serial port in FIR mode) because MSI requests are misinterpreted as DMA cycles by the broken LPC controller
  - Enabling multiple MSI vectors for the SATA controller when three or more SATA ports are used results in loss of interrupts and system hang.

== See also ==
- Comparison of AMD Chipsets
