= HD 4000 =

Hd 4000 may refer to:

- Radeon HD 4000 series
- Intel HD Graphics 4000
