= Radeon HD 4000 series =

Series of video cards

ATI Radeon HD 4000 series
- Release date: June 16, 2008; 17 years ago
- Codename: Radeon R700 series M9x series
- Architecture: TeraScale 1
- Transistors: 242M 55 nm (RV710); 514M 55 nm (RV730); 826M 40 nm (RV740); 956M 55 nm (RV770); 959M 55 nm (RV790)

Cards
- Entry-level: 4350, 4550, 4570
- Mid-range: 4650, 4670, 4730, 4750, 4770
- High-end: 4830, 4850, 4860, 4870
- Enthusiast: 4890, 4850X2, 4870X2

API support
- Direct3D: Direct3D 10.1; Shader Model 4.1
- OpenCL: OpenCL 1.1
- OpenGL: OpenGL 3.3

History
- Predecessor: Radeon HD 3000 series
- Successor: Radeon HD 5000 series

Support status
- Unsupported

The Radeon R700 is the engineering codename for a graphics processing unit series developed by Advanced Micro Devices under the ATI brand name. The foundation chip, codenamed RV770, was announced and demonstrated on June 16, 2008 as part of the FireStream 9250 and Cinema 2.0 initiative launch media event, with official release of the Radeon HD 4800 series on June 25, 2008. Other variants include enthusiast-oriented RV790, mainstream product RV730, RV740 and entry-level RV710.

Its direct competition was NVIDIA's GeForce 200 series, which launched in the same month.

== Architecture ==
This article is about all products under the brand "Radeon HD 4000 Series". All products implement TeraScale 1 microarchitecture.

=== Execution units ===
The RV770 extends the R600's unified shader architecture by increasing the stream processing unit count to 800 units (up from 320 units in the R600), which are grouped into 10 SIMD cores composed of 16 shader cores containing 4 FP MADD/DP ALUs and 1 MADD/transcendental ALU. The RV770 retains the R600's 4 Quad ROP cluster count, however, they are faster and now have dedicated hardware-based AA resolve in addition to the shader-based resolve of the R600 architecture. The RV770 also has 10 texture units, each of which can handle 4 addresses, 16 FP32 samples, and 4 FP32 filtering functions per clock cycle.

=== Memory and internal buses ===
RV770 features a 256-bit memory controller and is the first GPU to support GDDR5 memory, which runs at 900 MHz giving an effective transfer rate of 3.6 GHz and memory bandwidth of up to 115 GB/s. The internal ring bus from the R520 and R600 has been replaced by the combination of a crossbar and an internal hub.

=== Video acceleration ===
The SIP block UVD 2.0-2.2 implemented on the dies of all Radeon HD 4000 Series Desktop gpus, 48xx series is using uvd 2.0, 47xx-46xx-45xx-43xx series is using uvd 2.2.

Support is available for Microsoft Windows at release, for Linux with Catalyst 8.10. The free and open-source driver requires Linux kernel 3.10 in combination with Mesa 9.1 (exposed via the widely adopted VDPAU)), offering full hardware MPEG-2, H.264/MPEG-4 AVC and VC-1 decoding and the support for dual video streams, the Advanced Video Processor (AVP) also saw an upgrade with DVD upscaling capability and dynamic contrast feature. The RV770 series GPU also supports xvYCC color space output and 7.1 surround sound output (LPCM, AC3, DTS) over HDMI. The RV770 GPU also supports an Accelerated Video Transcoding (AVT) feature, which has video transcoding functions being assisted by the GPU, through stream processing.

=== GPU interconnect enhancements ===
R700 inter-GPU communications architecture

This generation of dual-GPU design retains the use of a PCI Express bridge, PLX PEX 8647 with a power dissipation of 3.8 watts inclusive of PCI Express 2.0 support, allowing two GPUs on the same PCI Express slot with doubled bandwidth over the past generation of product (Radeon HD 3870 X2). Subsequent generations of dual-GPU design also feature an interconnect for inter-GPU communications through the implementation of a CrossFire X SidePort on each GPU, giving extra 5 GB/s full-duplex inter-GPU bandwidth. These two features increase total bandwidth for dual-GPU designs to 21.8 GB/s.

=== OpenCL (API) ===
OpenCL accelerates many scientific Software Packages against CPU up to factor 10 or 100 and more. Open CL 1.0 to 1.1 are supported for all Chips with RV7xx.

== Desktop products ==
=== Radeon HD 4800 ===
The Radeon HD 4850 was announced on June 19, 2008 while the Radeon HD 4870 was announced on June 25, 2008. They are both based on the RV770 GPU, packing 956 million transistors and being produced on a 55 nm process. The Radeon HD 4850 currently uses GDDR3 memory, while the Radeon HD 4870 uses GDDR5 memory.

Another variant, the Radeon HD 4830 was updated on October 23, 2008, featuring the RV770 LE GPU with a 256-bit GDDR3 memory interface, and 640 shader processors. Basically the RV770 LE is a RV770 with some functional units disabled.

Dual GPU products using two RV770 GPUs, codenamed R700, were also announced. One product named Radeon HD 4870 X2, featuring 2×1GB GDDR5 memory, was released on August 12, 2008, while another dual-GPU product, the Radeon HD 4850 X2, with GDDR3 memory and lower clock speeds, is also available.

A minor update was introduced on April 2, 2009 with the launch of Radeon HD 4890 graphics cards based on the RV790 GPU. Featuring an improved design with decoupling capacitors to reduce signal noise, altered ASIC power distribution and re-timed the whole GPU chip, which resulted in a slight increase in die size but overall much better stability at high clock rates and a higher default clock. On August 18, 2009, AMD released a stripped down variant of the RV790 GPU called the RV790GT that is used by the Radeon HD 4860 which is now available in all markets.

=== Radeon HD 4700 ===
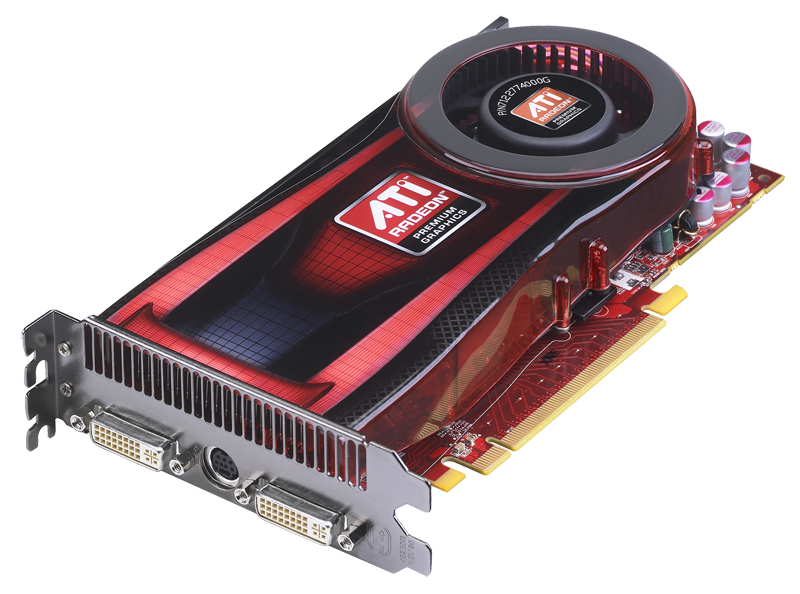
ATI Radeon HD 4770

The Radeon HD 4700 series was announced on April 28, 2009. The Radeon HD 4770, is based on the RV740 GPU, packs 826 million transistors and being produced on the latest 40 nm process. The Radeon HD 4730 was introduced June 8, 2009, unlike the RV740 based Radeon HD 4770, the 4730 is a stripped down 55 nm RV770 GPU, named the RV770CE. The 4730 packs 956 million transistors, and uses GDDR5 memory on a 128-bit bus. On September 9, 2009, the RV740PRO based Radeon HD 4750 was released exclusively to the Chinese market. The Radeon HD 4750 is based on the 40 nm RV740 of the Radeon HD 4770 but features a lower clock speed and the absence of a six-pin auxiliary power input.

=== Radeon HD 4600 ===
The Radeon HD 4600 series was announced on September 10, 2008. All variants are based on the RV730 GPU, packing 514 million transistors and being produced on a 55 nm process. The PCIe version 4600 series products do not require external power connectors. More recently, an AGP version of the 4670 has been released. This does require an external power connector. As of March 2018, this elusive AGP card remains among the last cards using the aging bus.

=== Radeon HD 4300/HD 4500 ===
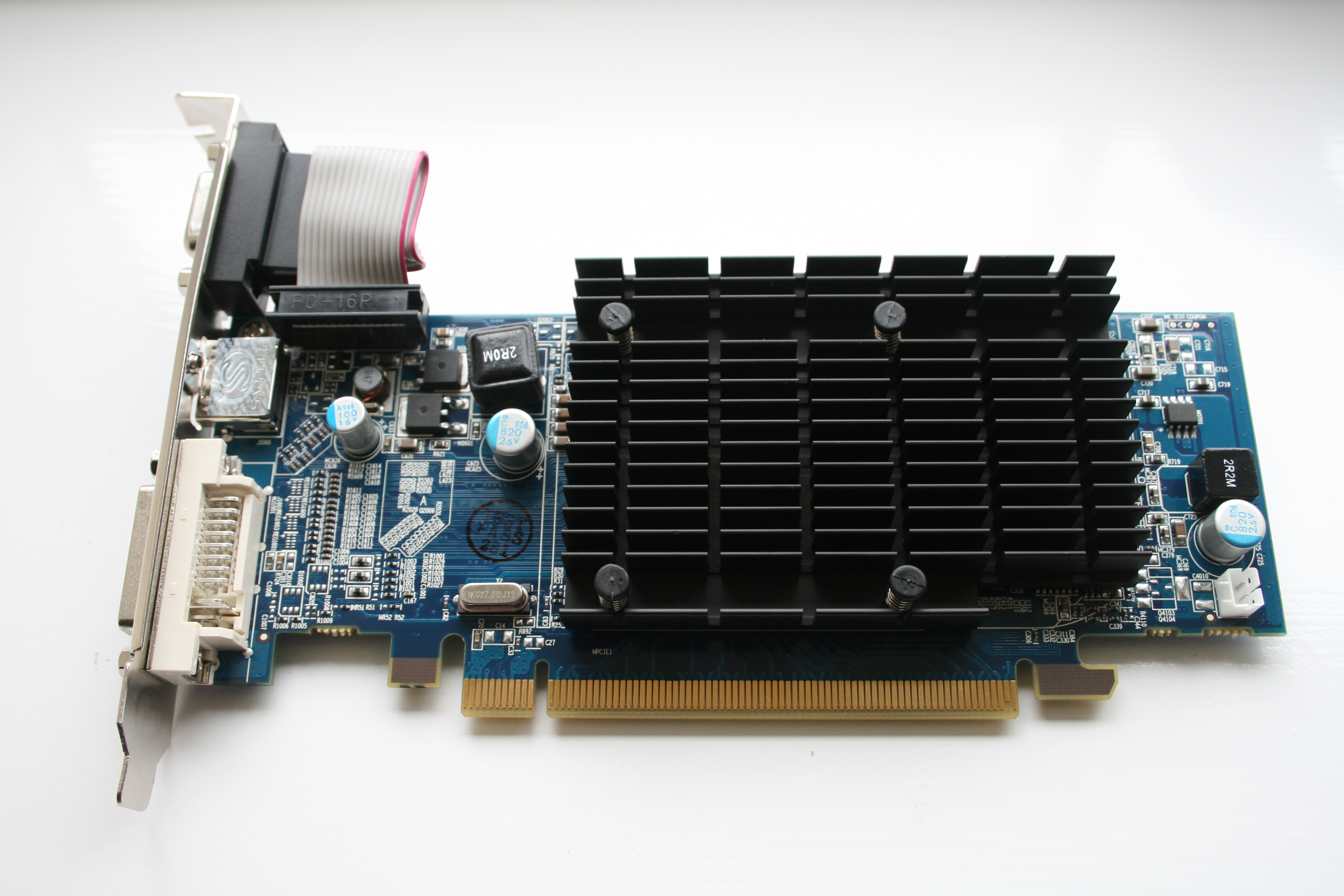
ATI Radeon HD 4550

The Radeon HD 4350 and Radeon HD 4550 were announced on September 30, 2008, both based on the RV710 GPU, packing 242 million transistors and being produced on a 55 nm process. Both products use either GDDR3, DDR3 or DDR2 video memory. AMD states these two products have maximum of 20 W and 25 W of power consumption under full load, respectively.

== Chipset Table ==
=== Desktop Products ===
Model^{4}	Launch	Code name	Fab (nm)	Transistors (million)	Die size (mm^{2})	Bus interface	Clock rate		Core config^{1}	Fillrate		Memory^{2}				Processing power (GFLOPS)		TDP^{3} (Watts)		Crossfire support	API support (version)			Release Price (USD)
Model^{4}	Launch	Code name	Fab (nm)	Transistors (million)	Die size (mm^{2})	Bus interface	Core (MHz)	Memory (MHz)	Core config^{1}	Pixel (GP/s)	Texture (GT/s)	Size (MB)	Bandwidth (GB/s)	Bus type	Bus width (bit)	Single precision	Double precision	Idle	Max.	Crossfire support	Direct3D	OpenGL	OpenCL	Release Price (USD)
Radeon HD 4350	Sep 30, 2008	RV710	55	242	73	PCIe 2.0 ×16; PCIe 2.0 ×1; AGP 8×	600	400; 650	80:8:4	2.40	4.80	256; 512; 1024	6.40; 10.4	DDR2; DDR3	64	92.0	No		20	No	10.1	3.3	1.0	?
Radeon HD 4550	Sep 30, 2008	RV710	55	242	73	PCIe 2.0 ×16	600; 600	655; 800	80:8:4	2.40	4.80	256; 512; 1024	10.5; 12.8	DDR2; GDDR3	64	96.0	No		25	No	10.1	3.3	1.0	?
Radeon HD 4570	Nov 25, 2008	RV710	55	242	73	PCIe 2.0 ×16	650	500	80:8:4	2.60	5.20	1024	8.00	DDR2	64	104.0	No		25	No	10.1	3.3	1.0	?
Radeon HD 4580	Nov 20, 2011	RV635 PRO	55	378	135	PCIe 2.0 ×16	796	693	120:8:4	3.18	6.37	512	22.2	GDDR3	128	191.0	No		65	No	10.1	3.3	1.0	?
Radeon HD 4650	Sep 10, 2008	RV730 PRO	55	514	146	PCIe 2.0 ×16; AGP 8×	600; 650	400 - 500; 500; 700	320:32:8	4.80; 5.20	19.2; 20.8	256; 512; 1024	12.8 - 16.0; 16.0; 22.4	DDR2; GDDR3; GDDR4	64; 128	384.0; 416.0	No		48	2-Way Crossfire	10.1	3.3	1.0	?
Radeon HD 4670	Sep 10, 2008	RV730 XT	55	514	146	PCIe 2.0 ×16; AGP 8×	750; 750	400 - 500; 900; 1000	320:32:8	6.00	24.0	512; 1024	12.8 - 16.0; 28.8; 32.0	DDR2; GDDR3; GDDR4	128	480.0	No		59	2-Way Crossfire	10.1	3.3	1.0	79
Radeon HD 4730	Jun 8, 2009	RV770 CE	55	956	256	PCIe 2.0 ×16	700; 750	900; 900	640:32:8	5.60; 6.00	22.4; 24.0	512	57.6	GDDR5	128	896.0; 960.0	179.2; 192.0		110	2-Way Crossfire	10.1	3.3	1.0	?
Radeon HD 4750	Sep 9, 2009	RV740	40	826	137	PCIe 2.0 ×16	730	800	640:32:16	11.7	23.4	512	51.2	GDDR5	128	934.4			80	2-Way Crossfire	10.1	3.3	1.0	?
Radeon HD 4770	Apr 28, 2009	RV740	40	826	137	PCIe 2.0 ×16	750	800	640:32:16	12.0	24.0	512	51.2	GDDR5	128	960.0	192.0		80	2-Way Crossfire	10.1	3.3	1.0	109
Radeon HD 4810	May 28, 2009	RV770 CE	55	956	256	PCIe 2.0 ×16	625; 750	900; 900	640:32:8	5.00; 6.00	20.0; 24.0	512	57.6	GDDR5	128	800.0; 960.0	160.0; 192.0		95	2-Way Crossfire	10.1	3.3	1.0	?
Radeon HD 4830	Oct 21, 2008	RV770 LE	55	956	256	PCIe 2.0 ×16	575	900	640:32:16	9.20	18.4	512; 1024	57.6	GDDR3; GDDR4	256	736.0	147.2		95	2-Way Crossfire	10.1	3.3	1.0	$130
Radeon HD 4850	Jun 25, 2008	RV770 PRO	55	956	256	PCIe 2.0 ×16	625	993	800:40:16	10.0	25.0	512; 1024; 2048	63.55	GDDR3; GDDR4; GDDR5	256	1000	200.0		110	4-Way Crossfire	10.1	3.3	1.0	199 (149)
Radeon HD 4860	Sep 9, 2009	RV790 GT	55	959	282	PCIe 2.0 ×16	700	750	640:32:16	11.2	22.4	512; 1024	96	GDDR5	256	896.0	179.2		130	4-Way Crossfire	10.1	3.3	1.0	?
Radeon HD 4870	Jun 25, 2008	RV770 XT	55	956	256	PCIe 2.0 ×16	750	900	800:40:16	12.0	30.0	512; 1024; 2048	115.2	GDDR5	256	1200	240.0		150	4-Way Crossfire	10.1	3.3	1.0	299 (225)
Radeon HD 4890	Apr 2, 2009	RV790 XT	55	959	282	PCIe 2.0 ×16	850	975	800:40:16	13.6	34.0	1024; 2048	124.8	GDDR5	256	1360	272.0		190	4-Way Crossfire	10.1	3.3	1.0	249
Radeon HD 4850 X2	Nov 7, 2008	R700 (2xRV770 PRO)	55	956×2	256×2	PCIe 2.0 ×16	625	995	800:40:16×2	10.0×2	25.0×2	512×2; 1024×2	63.7×2	GDDR3	256x2	2000	400.0		250	2-Way Crossfire	10.1	3.3	1.0	339
Radeon HD 4870 X2	Aug 12, 2008	R700 (2xRV770 XT)	55	956×2	256×2	PCIe 2.0 ×16	750	900	800:40:16×2	12×2	30×2	1024×2	115.2×2	GDDR5	256x2	2400	480.0		286	2-Way Crossfire	10.1	3.3	1.0	449
Model^{4}	Launch	Code name	Fab (nm)	Transistors (million)	Die size (mm^{2})	Bus interface	Clock rate		Core config^{1}	Fillrate		Memory^{2}				Processing power (GFLOPS)		TDP^{3} (Watts)		Crossfire Support	API support (version)			Release Price (USD)
Model^{4}	Launch	Code name	Fab (nm)	Transistors (million)	Die size (mm^{2})	Bus interface	Core (MHz)	Memory (MHz)	Core config^{1}	Pixel (GP/s)	Texture (GT/s)	Size (MB)	Bandwidth (GB/s)	Bus type	Bus width (bit)	Single precision	Double precision	Idle	Max.	Crossfire Support	Direct3D	OpenGL	OpenCL	Release Price (USD)

^{1} Unified shaders : Texture mapping units : Render output units
^{2} The effective data transfer rate of GDDR5 is quadruple its nominal clock, instead of double as it is with other DDR memory.
^{3} The TDP is reference design TDP values from AMD. Different non-reference board designs from vendors may lead to slight variations in actual TDP.
^{4} All models feature UVD2 & PowerPlay.

==== IGP (HD 4000) ====
- All Radeon HD 4000 IGP models include Direct3D 10.1 and OpenGL 2.0

Model	Launch	Code name	Graphics core	Fab (nm)	Transistors (million)	Die size (mm^{2})	Bus interface	Core clock^{2} (MHz)	Core config^{1}	Fillrate			Memory^{3}					Processing power (GFLOPS)	Features / Notes
Model	Launch	Code name	Graphics core	Fab (nm)	Transistors (million)	Die size (mm^{2})	Bus interface	Core clock^{2} (MHz)	Core config^{1}	Pixel (GP/s)	Texture (GT/s)	FP32 (GP/s)	Size (MB)	Bandwidth (GB/s)	Bus type	Effective clock (MHz)	Bus width (bit)	Processing power (GFLOPS)	Features / Notes
Radeon HD 4200 Graphics (785G Chipset)	Aug 2009	RS880	RV620	55	>205	~73 (~9 × 8.05)	HT 3.0	500	40:4:4	2	2	1	Up to 512 system + optional 128 sideport	20.8 (system) + 2.6 (sideport)	HT (system) + DDR2-1066 DDR3-1333 (sideport)	1333 (sideport)	16 (sideport)	40	UVD2
Radeon HD 4250 Graphics (880G Chipset)	Mar 2010	RS880	RV620	55	>205	~73 (~9 × 8.05)	HT 3.0	560	40:4:4	2.24	2.24	1.12	Up to 512 system + optional 128 sideport	20.8 (system) + 2.6 (sideport)	HT (system) + DDR3-1333 (sideport)	1333 (sideport)	16 (sideport)	44.8	UVD2
Radeon HD 4290 Graphics (890GX Chipset)	Mar 2010	RS880D	RV620	55	>205	~73 (~9 × 8.05)	HT 3.0	700	40:4:4	2.8	2.8	1.4	Up to 512 system + 128 sideport	20.8 (system) + 2.6 (sideport)	HT (system) + DDR3-1333 (sideport)	1333 (sideport)	16 (sideport)	56	UVD2

^{1} Unified shaders : Texture mapping units : Render output units
^{2} The clock frequencies may vary in different usage scenarios, as ATI PowerPlay technology is implemented. The clock frequencies listed here refer to the officially announced clock specifications.
^{3} The sideport is a dedicated memory bus. It preferably used for frame buffer.

== Radeon Feature Matrix ==
The following table shows features of AMD/ATI's GPUs (see also: List of AMD graphics processing units).

Name of GPU series	Wonder	Mach	3D Rage	Rage Pro	Rage 128	R100	R200	R300	R400	R500	R600	RV670	R700	Evergreen	Northern Islands		Southern Islands	Sea Islands	Volcanic Islands	Arctic Islands/Polaris	Vega	Navi 1x	Navi 2x	Navi 3x	Navi 4x
Released	1986	1991	Apr; 1996	Mar; 1997	Aug; 1998	Apr; 2000	Aug; 2001	Sep; 2002	May; 2004	Oct; 2005	May; 2007	Nov; 2007	Jun; 2008	Sep; 2009	Oct; 2010	Dec; 2010	Jan; 2012	Sep; 2013	Jun; 2015	Jun 2016, Apr 2017, Aug 2019	Jun 2017, Feb 2019	Jul; 2019	Nov; 2020	Dec; 2022	Feb; 2025
Marketing Name	Wonder	Mach	3D; Rage	Rage; Pro	Rage; 128	Radeon; 7000	Radeon; 8000	Radeon; 9000	Radeon; X700/X800	Radeon; X1000	Radeon; HD 2000	Radeon; HD 3000	Radeon; HD 4000	Radeon; HD 5000	Radeon; HD 6000		Radeon; HD 7000	Radeon; 200	Radeon; 300	Radeon; 400/500/600	Radeon; RX Vega, Radeon VII	Radeon; RX 5000	Radeon; RX 6000	Radeon; RX 7000	Radeon; RX 9000
AMD support	Ended																			Current					
Kind	2D		3D																						
Instruction set architecture	Not publicly known										TeraScale instruction set						GCN instruction set					RDNA instruction set			
Microarchitecture	Not publicly known					GFX1		GFX2			TeraScale 1 (VLIW5) (GFX3)			TeraScale 2 (VLIW5) (GFX4)	TeraScale 2 (VLIW5) up to 68xx (GFX4)	TeraScale 3 (VLIW4) in 69xx (GFX5)	GCN 1st gen (GFX6)	GCN 2nd gen (GFX7)	GCN 3rd gen (GFX8)	GCN 4th gen (GFX8)	GCN 5th gen (GFX9)	RDNA (GFX10.1)	RDNA 2 (GFX10.3)	RDNA 3 (GFX11)	RDNA 4 (GFX12)
Type	Fixed pipeline (Note: The Radeon 100 Series has programmable pixel shaders, but do not fully comply with DirectX 8 or Pixel Shader 1.0. See article on R100's pixel shaders.)						Programmable pixel & vertex pipelines				Unified shader model														
Direct3D	—		5.0	6.0		7.0	8.1	9.0; 11 (9_2)	9.0b 11 (9_2)	9.0c 11 (9_3)	10.0; 11 (10_0)	10.1; 11 (10_1)		11 (11_0)			11 (11_1); 12 (11_1)	11 (12_0); 12 (12_0)			11 (12_1); 12 (12_1)		11 (12_1); 12 (12_2)		
Shader model	—						1.4	2.0+	2.0b	3.0	4.0	4.1		5.0			5.1	5.1; 6.5			6.7				6.8
OpenGL	—			1.1	1.2	1.3		1.5 (Note: R300, R400 and R500 based cards do not fully comply with OpenGL 2+ as the hardware does not support all types of non-power of two (NPOT) textures.)			3.3			4.6 (Note: OpenGL 4+ compliance requires supporting FP64 shaders and these are emulated on some TeraScale chips using 32-bit hardware.)											
Vulkan	—															1.1 (Note: Vulkan support is theoretically possible but has not been implemented in a stable driver.)	1.3		1.4						
OpenCL	—										Close to Metal		1.1 (not supported by Mesa)	1.2+ (on Linux: 1.1+ (no Image support on Clover, with by Rusticl) with Mesa, 1.2+ on GCN 1.Gen)				2.0+ (Adrenalin driver on Win7+) (on Linux ROCm, Mesa 1.2+ (no Image support in Clover, but in Rusticl with Mesa, 2.0+ and 3.0 with AMD drivers or AMD ROCm), 5th gen: 2.2 win 10+ and Linux RocM 5.0+				2.2+ and 3.0 Windows 8.1+ and Linux ROCm 5.0+ (Mesa Rusticl 1.2+ and 3.0 (2.1+ and 2.2+ wip))			
HSA / ROCm	—																Yes					?			
Video decoding ASIC	—										Avivo/UVD	UVD+	UVD 2	UVD 2.2	UVD 3		UVD 4	UVD 4.2	UVD 5.0 or 6.0	UVD 6.3	UVD 7 (Note: The UVD and VCE were replaced by the Video Core Next (VCN) ASIC in the Raven Ridge APU implementation of Vega.)	VCN 2.0	VCN 3.0	VCN 4.0	VCN 5.0
Video encoding ASIC	—																VCE 1.0	VCE 2.0	VCE 3.0 or 3.1	VCE 3.4	VCE 4.0	VCN 2.0	VCN 3.0	VCN 4.0	VCN 5.0
Fluid Motion (Note: Video processing for video frame rate interpolation technique. In Windows it works as a DirectShow filter in your player. In Linux, there is no support on the part of drivers and / or community.)	No																	Yes				No		?	
Power saving	?										PowerPlay				PowerTune		PowerTune & ZeroCore Power					?			
TrueAudio	—																	Via dedicated DSP		Via shaders					
FreeSync	—																	1; 2							
HDCP (Note: To play protected video content, it also requires card, operating system, driver, and application support. A compatible HDCP display is also needed for this. HDCP is mandatory for the output of certain audio formats, placing additional constraints on the multimedia setup.)	—										?							1.4		2.2		2.3			
PlayReady	—																			3.0	No	3.0			
Supported displays (Note: More displays may be supported with native DisplayPort connections, or splitting the maximum resolution between multiple monitors with active converters.)						1–2	2							2–6								?			4
Max. resolution	?													2–6 × 2560×1600			2–6 × 4096×2160 @ 30 Hz			2–6 × 5120×2880 @ 60 Hz	3 × 7680×4320 @ 60 Hz	7680×4320 @ 60 Hz PowerColor		7680x4320 @165 Hz	7680x4320
/drm/radeon (Note: DRM (Direct Rendering Manager) is a component of the Linux kernel. AMDgpu is the Linux kernel module. Support in this table refers to the most current version.)						Yes													—						
/drm/amdgpu	—																	Optional	Yes						

== Graphics device drivers ==
=== AMD's proprietary graphics device driver "Catalyst" ===
AMD Catalyst is being developed for Microsoft Windows and Linux. As of July 2014, other operating systems are not officially supported. This may be different for the AMD FirePro brand, which is based on identical hardware but features OpenGL-certified graphics device drivers.

AMD Catalyst supports all features advertised for the Radeon brand.

The Radeon HD 4000 series has been transitioned to legacy support, where drivers will be updated only to fix bugs instead of being optimized for new applications.

=== Free and open-source graphics device driver "Radeon" ===
The free and open-source drivers are primarily developed on Linux and for Linux, but have been ported to other operating systems as well. Each driver is composed out of five parts:

1. Linux kernel component DRM
2. Linux kernel component KMS driver: basically the device driver for the display controller
3. user-space component libDRM
4. user-space component in Mesa 3D
5. a special and distinct 2D graphics device driver for X.Org Server, which is finally about to be replaced by Glamor

The free and open-source "Radeon" graphics driver supports most of the features implemented into the Radeon line of GPUs.

The free and open-source "Radeon" graphics device drivers are not reverse engineered, but based on documentation released by AMD.

== See also ==
- AMD FirePro
- AMD FireMV
- AMD FireStream
- List of AMD graphics processing units
