= XTU =

XTU may refer to:

- Xiangtan University, a provincial public university in Xiangtan, Hunan, China
- xtu, the ISO 639-3 code for Cuyamecalco Mixtec, a Mixtec language
- Intel Extreme Tuning Utility, a utility software
