= Ryzen Master =

Utility software developed by AMD

- Developer: Advanced Micro Devices, Inc.
- Release: March 2017; 9 years ago
- Stable release: 3.1.0.5185 / 11 May 2026; 2 months ago
- Operating system: Windows 10, Windows 11
- Predecessor: AMD OverDrive
- Available in: English
- Type: Utility software
- Website: Official website

Ryzen Master is a utility software by AMD that lets users tweak their central processing unit (CPU) without the need to enter BIOS. Features include adjusting CPU clock speed and voltage, RAM clock frequency and timings, and the clock speed of the iGPU. The software offers a number of profiles to save settings. It also features a tool to find a CPU's fastest cores, options to import and export profiles, as well as one-click overclock settings.

== History ==
Ryzen Master was released by AMD in March 2017, with their first-generation Ryzen-branded CPUs, and replaced AMD OverDrive. A selectable "Eco Mode" limiting compatible CPUs to 105 Watt was added in 2024. The software received an UI overhaul in 2025. The utility's integrated stress tests for CPU and RAM were also updated in 2025.

== Reception ==
CNET praised the software for its wide variety of features and real-time monitoring option, but described the interface as "intimidating".

Heise online commented on the integrated stress test in 2025, saying "based on our experience, stable performance in the Ryzen Master tool’s stress test does not guarantee that crashes will not occur in other applications."

In 2026, TechSpot included Ryzen Master in a "list of essential desktop apps", calling it "especially useful for enthusiasts working with unlocked chips or high-end laptops that allow tuning".

== See also ==
- Intel Extreme Tuning Utility, equivalent software by Intel
