= AMD 700 chipset series =

Set of chipsets by ATI

AMD 700 chipset series/ AMD 7-Series Chipsets
- Codenames: Wahoo (790FX, Quad FX); Hammerhead (790FX); Seahorse (780G); Mahogany (780E)
- CPU supported: Phenom series Athlon 64 series Sempron series Turion 64 X2 series Phenom II series
- Socket supported: Socket F+/F (790FX/DSDC); Socket AM2+, AM2, AM3; Socket S1
- Southbridges: SB600, SB700, SB710, SB750

Desktop / mobile chipsets
- Enthusiast segment: 790FX
- Performance segment: 790GX, 790X, M780T (Mobile)
- Mainstream segment: 780G, 785G, 770, 760G; M780G (Mobile)
- Value segment: 780V, 740G, 740; M740G (Mobile)

Embedded chipsets
- 780E, 785E

Miscellaneous
- Release dates: November 19, 2007 (790FX, 790X, 770); March 4, 2008 (780G, 740G); April 28, 2008 (780V); June 4, 2008 (M780G); August 6, 2008 (790GX); October 26, 2008 (780E); April 26, 2010 (785E)
- IGP Direct3D support: 10.1 (785G, 785E); 10.0 (790GX, 780 series, 760G); 9.0b (740G)
- Predecessor: AMD 690 chipset series
- Successor: AMD 800 chipset series

The AMD 700 chipset series (also called as AMD 7-Series Chipsets) is a set of chipsets designed by ATI for AMD's Phenom processors to be sold under the AMD brand. Several members were launched in the end of 2007 and the first half of 2008, others launched throughout the rest of 2008.

== Development history ==
The existence of the chipsets was proven in October 2006 through two hardware websites in Chile and Spain which posted the leaked slides of an ATI internal event, "ATI chipset update". In the slides, ATI has shown a series of RD700 chipset variants codenamed RD790, RX790, RS780 and RS740 respectively. A SB700 southbridge was also mentioned in the event. The 790X (codename RD780) chipset was spotted in Computex 2007, exhibited by ASUS. The RS780D was first reported by HKEPC while the RX780H was first seen on ECS internal presentations.

After the acquisition of ATI Technologies, AMD started to participate in the development of the chipset series. And as a result, the first performance- and enthusiast-segment chipset products under the AMD brand, the 790FX, 790X and 770 chipsets were launched on November 19, 2007 as part of the desktop performance platform codenamed Spider. The 780 chipset series, first launched in China on January 23, 2008, and released worldwide on March 5, 2008 during CeBIT 2008, mobile chipsets (M740G, M780G and M780T chipsets) were released on June 4, 2008 during Computex 2008 as part of the Puma mobile platform and the 790GX chipset was released on August 6, 2008, while some other members were released at a later date in 2008. The 785G was announced on August 4, 2009.

== Line-up ==
=== 790FX ===
- Codenamed RD790, final name revealed to be "AMD 790FX chipset"
- single AMD processor configuration
- Four physical PCIe 2.0 x16 slots @ x8 or two physical PCIe 2.0 x16 slots, one PCIe 2.0 x4 slot and two PCIe 2.0 x1 slots, the chipset provides a total of 38 PCIe 2.0 lanes and 4 PCIe 1.1 for A-Link Express II solely in the Northbridge
- HyperTransport 3.0 with support for HTX slots and PCI Express 2.0
- ATI CrossFire X
- AutoXpress
- AMD OverDrive
- Energy efficient Northbridge design
  - 65 nm CMOS fabrication process manufactured by TSMC
- Extreme overclocking, reported to have achieved about 420 MHz bus for overclocking an Athlon 64 FX-62 processor, from originally 200 MHz.
- Optional discrete chipset cache memory of at least 16 KB to reduce latencies and increase bandwidth
- Supports Dual Gigabit Ethernet, and teaming option
- Reference board codenamed "Wahoo" for dual-processor system reference design board with three physical PCI-E x16 slots, and "HammerHead" for single-socket system reference design board with four physical PCI-E x16 slots, also notable was the reference boards includes two ATA ports and only four SATA 3.0 Gbit/s ports (as being paired with SB600 southbridge).
- Will pair with SB750 southbridge with support up to six SATA ports and enhanced Phenom processors overclocking via ACC functionality, and will later support Socket AM3 with DDR3 SDRAM support in the first quarter of 2009.
- Enthusiast discrete multi-graphics segment
- Public documentation is not available yet

=== 790X ===
- Codenamed RD780, final name revealed to be "AMD 790X chipset"
- Single AMD processor configuration
- One physical PCIe 2.0 x16 slot or two physical PCIe 2.0 x16 slots @ x8, one PCIe 2.0 x4 slot and two PCIe 2.0 x1 slots, the chipset provides a total of 22 PCIe 2.0 lanes and 4 PCIe 1.1 for A-Link Express II solely in the Northbridge
- HyperTransport 3.0 and PCI Express 2.0
- ATI CrossFire
- AutoXpress
- AMD OverDrive
- Energy efficient Northbridge design
  - 65 nm CMOS fabrication process manufactured by TSMC
- Mobile version (codenamed RD780M) planned, supporting CrossFire for two AXIOM/MXM discrete mobile GPUs
- Can pair with SB750 southbridge with support up to six SATA ports and enhanced Phenom processors overclocking via ACC functionality.
- Supports Socket AM3 with DDR3 SDRAM depending on motherboard BIOS
- Performance discrete multi-graphics segment

=== 790GX ===
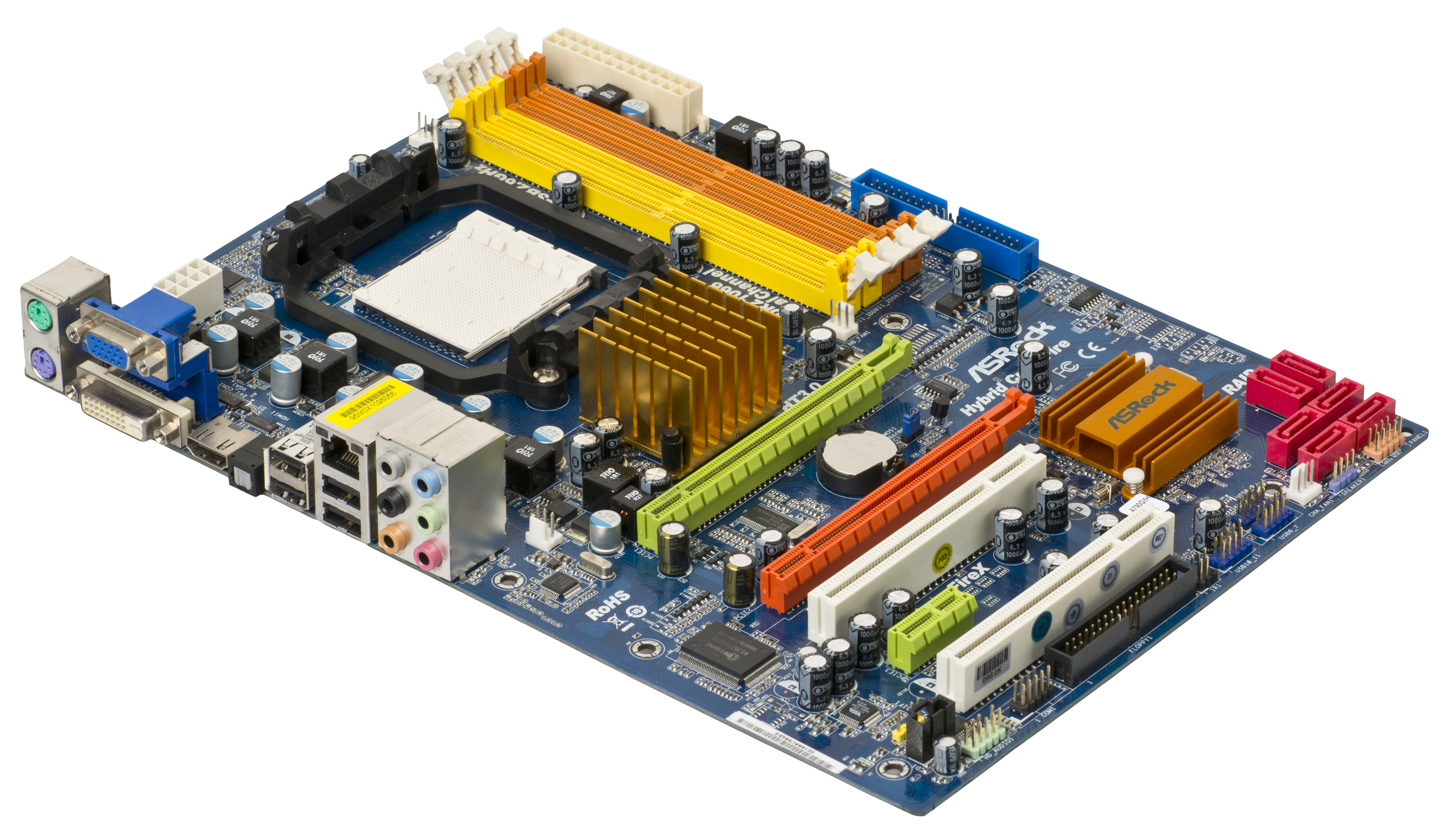
A motherboard using the 790GX Northbridge chipset

- Codenamed RS780D, final name seen on internal AMD presentation
- Single AMD processor configuration
- One physical PCIe 2.0 x16 slot or two physical PCIe 2.0 x16 slots @ x8, one PCIe 2.0 x4 slot and two PCIe 2.0 x1 slots, the chipset provides a total of 22 PCIe 2.0 lanes and 4 PCIe 1.1 for A-Link Express II solely in the Northbridge
- Integrated graphics: Radeon HD 3300
  - ATI Hybrid Graphics
  - Side-port memory as local frame buffer, supporting DDR2 and GDDR3 chips.
  - ATI PowerPlay technology
  - UVD+
- Two physical PCI-E x16 slots (one 16x and one 8x electrically. In Crossfire mode, both will revert to 8x electrically)
- HyperTransport 3.0 and PCI Express 2.0
- ATI CrossFire
  - Hybrid CrossFire X
- AMD OverDrive
- Energy efficient Northbridge design
  - 55 nm CMOS fabrication process manufactured by TSMC
  - 528-pin Flip Chip Ball Grid Array (FCBGA) package
- Performance hybrid multi-graphics segment

=== 785G ===
- Codenamed RS880
- Single AMD processor configuration
- One physical PCIe 2.0 x16 slot, one PCIe 2.0 x4 slot and two PCIe 2.0 x1 slots, the chipset provides a total of 22 PCIe 2.0 lanes and 4 PCIe 1.1 for A-Link Express II solely in the Northbridge
- Integrated graphics: Radeon HD 4200
  - ATI Hybrid Graphics and PowerXpress
  - Side-port memory as local frame buffer, supporting DDR2 and DDR3
  - UVD 2.0
  - ATI Stream capabilities
- No 7.1-channel LPCM support
- HyperTransport 3.0 and PCI Express 2.0
- AMD OverDrive
- Energy efficient Northbridge design
  - 55 nm CMOS fabrication process by TSMC
- Mainstream hybrid graphics (DirectX 10.1 IGP) segment

=== 785E ===
- Codenamed RS785E
- Single AMD processor configuration
- One physical PCIe 2.0 x16 slot or two physical PCIe 2.0 x16 slots @ x8, one PCIe 2.0 x4 slot and two PCIe 2.0 x1 slots, the chipset provides a total of 22 PCIe 2.0 lanes and 4 PCIe 1.1 for A-Link Express II solely in the Northbridge
- Integrated graphics: Radeon HD 4200
  - ATI Hybrid Graphics and PowerXpress
  - Side-port memory as local frame buffer, supporting DDR2 and GDDR3
  - ATI PowerPlay technology
  - UVD 2
- HyperTransport 3.0 and PCI Express 2.0
- ATI CrossFire
  - Hybrid CrossFire X
- High-end embedded systems segment

=== 780G/780V ===
- Codenamed RS780/RS780C
- Single AMD processor configuration
- One physical PCIe 2.0 x16 slot, one PCIe 2.0 x4 slot and two PCIe 2.0 x1 slots, the chipset provides a total of 22 PCIe 2.0 lanes and 4 PCIe 1.1 for A-Link Express II solely in the Northbridge
- Integrated graphics: Radeon HD 3200 (780G), Radeon 3100 (780V)
  - 205 million transistors
  - ATI Hybrid Graphics and PowerXpress (780G only, PowerXpress for M780G only)
  - Side-port memory as local frame buffer, supporting DDR2 and GDDR3 chips (780G only)
  - ATI PowerPlay technology
  - UVD+ (780G only)
- One physical PCI-E x16 slot
- HyperTransport 3.0 and PCI Express 2.0
- AMD OverDrive
- Energy efficient Northbridge design
  - 55 nm CMOS fabrication process manufactured by TSMC
  - 528-pin Flip Chip Ball Grid Array (FCBGA) package
  - 1.1 V core voltage
- "Remote IT" (temporary name, 780V only)
- Pin-to-Pin compatible to RS690
- Reference board design codenamed "Seahorse"
- Mobile version (M780G, codenamed RS780M/M780V, codenamed RS780MC) demonstrated in May 2007, and will be available during second or third quarter (Q2-Q3) 2008, with the implementation of PowerXpress technology, providing one PCI-E slot for AXIOM/MXM modules and HyperFlash support for the Puma platform
- Mainstream hybrid graphics (DirectX 10 IGP) segment (780G), value and commercial DirectX 10 IGP segment (780V)

=== 780E ===
- Codenamed RS780E
- Single AMD processor configuration
- One physical PCIe 2.0 x16 slot or two physical PCIe 2.0 x16 slots @ x8, one PCIe 2.0 x4 slot and two PCIe 2.0 x1 slots, the chipset provides a total of 22 PCIe 2.0 lanes and 4 PCIe 1.1 for A-Link Express II solely in the Northbridge
- Integrated graphics: Radeon HD 3200
  - 205 million transistors
  - ATI Hybrid Graphics and PowerXpress
  - Side-port memory as local frame buffer, supporting DDR2 and GDDR3 chips up to 128 MB
  - ATI PowerPlay technology
  - UVD+
- One x16 or two x8 PCI-E x16 slot (physical x16 slot)
- HyperTransport 3.0 and PCI Express 2.0
- ATI CrossFire
  - Hybrid CrossFire X
- Energy efficient Northbridge design
  - 55 nm CMOS fabrication process manufactured by TSMC
  - 528-pin Flip Chip Ball Grid Array (FCBGA) package
  - 1.1 V core voltage
- Reference development board design codenamed "Mahogany"
- High-end embedded systems segment

=== 770 ===
- Codenamed RX780, final product name revealed by ECS
- Single AMD processor configuration
- One physical PCIe 2.0 x16 slot, one PCIe 2.0 x4 slot and two PCIe 2.0 x1 slots, the chipset provides a total of 22 PCIe 2.0 lanes and 4 PCIe 1.1 for A-Link Express II solely in the Northbridge
- HyperTransport 3.0 and PCI Express 2.0
- AMD OverDrive
- Energy efficient Northbridge design
  - 65 nm CMOS fabrication process manufactured by TSMC
- Mobile version (M770, codenamed RX781), supports discrete graphics, and support for "add-on" graphics solution, via external PCI-E cabling
- Mainstream discrete single-graphics segment
- Public documentation is not available yet

=== 760G ===
- Codenamed RS780L
- Single AMD processor configuration
- One physical PCIe 2.0 x16 slot and one PCIe 2.0 x4 slot, the chipset provides a total of 20 PCIe 2.0 lanes and 4 PCIe 1.1 for A-Link Express II solely in the Northbridge
- Integrated graphics: Radeon 3000 Graphics
  - GPU 350 MHz, memory shared DDR3 533 MHz, power consumption 5.1-6.1 W
  - ATI PowerPlay technology
  - ATI Hybrid Graphics
- 55 nm CMOS fabrication process manufactured by TSMC
- HyperTransport 3.0 and PCI Express 2.0
- Value DirectX 10.0 IGP segment
- Public documentation is not available yet

=== 740 ===
- Codenamed RX740
- Single AMD processor configuration
- One physical PCIe 1.1 x16 slot and one PCIe 1.1 x4 slot, the chipset provides a total of 20 PCIe 1.1 lanes and 4 PCIe 1.1 for A-Link Express II solely in the Northbridge
- HyperTransport 2.0 and PCI Express 1.1a
- Energy efficient Northbridge design
- Value discrete single-graphics segment
- Public documentation is not available yet

=== Southbridges ===
Besides the use of SB600 southbridge for earlier releases of several members in late 2007, all of the above chipsets can also utilize newer southbridge designs, the SB700, SB710 and the SB750 southbridges. Future server chipsets will also utilize the server version (SB700S/SB750S) of the southbridges. Features provided by the southbridge are listed as follows:

==== SB700 ====
- Support up to 6 SATA 3.0 Gbit/s hard disk drives, with RAID 0, 1, 10 support
- eSATA support
- 1 x IDE connector supporting ATA-133/100/66/33 and up to 2 IDE devices
- Support up to 14 USB ports (12 USB 2.0 and 2 USB 1.1)
- I/O acceleration technologies
- Consumer Infrared receiver/transmitter port compatible with IrDA standards
- DASH 1.0 support

==== SB710 ====
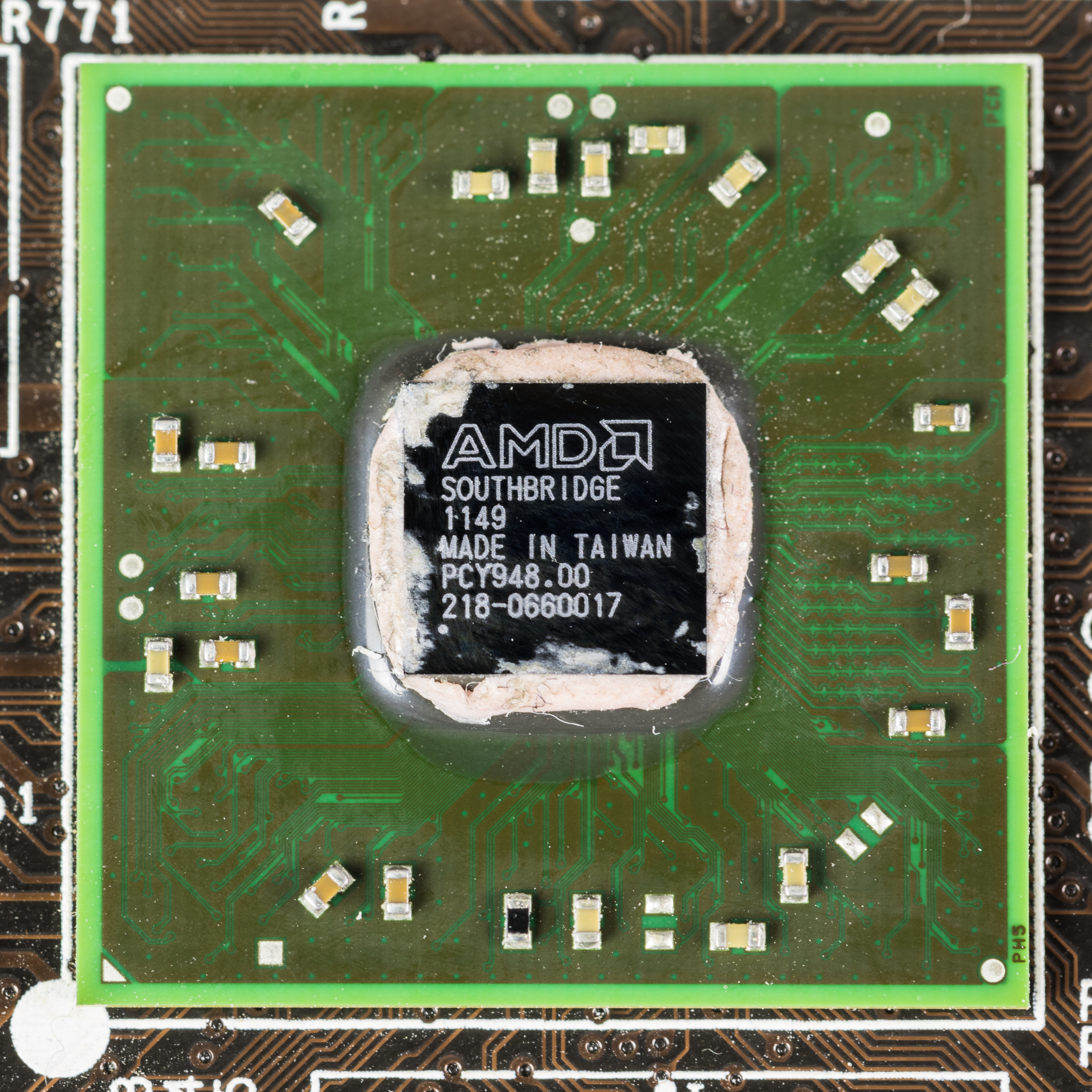
- AMD Southbridge SB710
  All features from SB700
- Super I/O
- Advanced Clock Calibration for enhanced CPU overclocking
  - Direct communication channel composed of six data pins which were previously reserved between the CPU and the southbridge
  - Advanced Clock Calibration (Option available with AMD OverDrive software 2.1.1 and later)

==== SB750 ====
- All features of SB700
- RAID 5 support
- Super I/O
- Enhanced CPU overclocking for K10-based processors only, originally named "OverDrive 3.0"
  - Direct communication channel composed of six data pins which were previously reserved between the CPU and the southbridge
  - Advanced Clock Calibration (Option available with AMD OverDrive software 2.1.1 and later)

==== SP5100 ====
- All features of SB700
- Super I/O
- Target for future server chipsets
- Originally named SB700S, later renamed as SP5100.

==== SB750S ====
- All features of SB750
- Target for future server chipsets

== Key features ==
=== Multi-graphics ===
The ATI CrossFire X technology supports multiple video cards to be connected to enhance the visual display and 3D rendering capabilities of the system, using AFR mode and/or scissor mode. Alternatively, systems with multiple video card CrossFire X setup will support multiple display monitors up to eight.

For the AMD 790FX chipset, the CrossFire X technology allows up to 4 video cards to be connected, made possible as the chipset supports four physical PCI-E x16 slots. The PCI-E lanes can be configured for 4 slots at x8 bandwidth or 2 slots at x16 bandwidth (16x-16x, 8x-8x-8x or 8x-8x-8x-8x CrossFire X setup). Reports indicate 2.6 times the performance with triple-card CrossFire than that of a single card, and more than 3.3 times the performance increase for quad-card CrossFire. Gigabyte have revealed in a leaked product presentation that the four card CrossFire X setup does not require CrossFire connectors; the data will be exchanged among the PCI-E slots which is monitored and controlled by Catalyst drivers.

For the performance segment, CrossFire on the AMD 790X chipset has two physical PCI-E x16 slots with one operating at x8 bandwidth (dual-card 8x-8x CrossFire), supporting up to four display monitors.

Multi-graphics is also supported for the 790GX IGP chipset, named as Hybrid CrossFire X.

=== AMD OverDrive ===
AMD OverDrive
- Developer: AMD
- Final release: 4.3.2.703 / 9 March 2015; 11 years ago
- Operating system: Windows 7, Windows 8
- Successor: Ryzen Master
- Type: Performance tuning
- License: Proprietary
- Website: www.amd.com/en/technologies/amd-overdrive

Another feature is AMD OverDrive, an application designed to boost system performance through a list of items in real-time, without a system reboot, as listed below:

- Real-time Overclocking:
  - Novice mode for users not familiar with system tuning, includes a slider of level 0 to 10 for easy system tuning
  - Advanced mode for more familiar enthusiasts to fine tune various system parameters including: Clock frequencies – independent clock frequencies for independent processor cores (Phenom processors only), PCI-E lanes, system bus frequency; Multipliers for each of the CPU cores and HyperTransport links (downward direction only except Black Edition processors); And voltages for CPU (VID and V_{DDC}), CPU HyperTransport, DDR2 Memory (V_{DDQ} and V_{TT}), northbridge core (V_{Core}) and Northbridge PCI-E. Overclocking also applies to the IGP and the side-port memory since the release of version 2.1.4.
  - "Auto Clock" for automatic fine-tuning and overclocking
- Memory fine-tuning – DDR2 Memory parameters
- System monitoring:
  - System information
    - Simple mode – Windows Task Manager like CPU cores usage histogram, with CPU core clock Frequencies, CPU Multipliers, CPU core voltages (V_{Core}), CPU Temperature; GPU details including GPU core frequency, video memory frequency; and system parameters including system bus frequency, southbridge frequency, PCI-E lanes frequency and memory frequency
    - Detailed mode – include all system information items presented in the simple mode, with the addition of CPU caches, CPU voltages, memory details including memory frequencies and SPD settings, HyperTransport frequency and link width
  - System Monitor
  - (Optional) System benchmark, resulting a value to reflect relative system performance, tests include: integer computation, floating-point computation, memory speed, cache speed
  - (Optional) Processor stability test, normally runs for one hour, can also be run for a minimum of 1 minute or a maximum of seven days, to identify whether the system becomes unstable for use after fine-tuning under full-loading condition. Tests include: integer (integer units) calculations and stack operations test for each processor core, floating-point (128-bit FPU) calculations test for each processor core, calculation test (Phenom processors only), MCA registers checking test
- Maintenance/User-friendly functionalities:
  - Profile(s) saving and loading capabilities
  - Log records output

The application supported all members of the AMD 700 chipset series, including the 740 series chipsets which are aimed at value markets, and AMD processors including Phenom and Athlon 64 family of processors, but due to architectural limitations, independent clock frequency settings for different processor cores (a feature implemented in the K10 microarchitecture) did not function on Athlon 64 family of processors (except for Athlon X2 7000 series which is based on K10).

The software's equivalent by Intel is Intel Extreme Tuning Utility. AMD OverDrive was replaced by Ryzen Master in 2017.

=== AutoXpress ===
The AutoXpress technology is a set of automatic system tuning features to enhance system performance, which were revealed by members of ChileHardware when investigating the BIOS for AMD 790FX, 790X and 770 chipsets. AutoXpress will be available on AMD 790FX (codenamed RD790) chipset, with AMD 790X (codenamed RD780) and AMD 770 (codenamed RX780) chipsets implementing a subset of all the features. The AutoXpress technology is similar to the LinkBoost capability presented on NVIDIA nForce 500/600 chipsets.

The feature must be enabled via BIOS, options appeared in the BIOS includes ON/OFF/Custom, which choosing the "Custom" option will open up three further options, namely "CPU", "XpressRoute" and "MemBoost" with ON/OFF options, and ON as default. Details about the AutoXpress features are listed as follows:

AutoXpress
CPU
Availability	CPU supported	Other hardware	Particulars			
790FX, 790X, 770	AMD Phenom family	—N/a	Change CPU ClkDivisor to "Divide-by-1" mode, allowing 1 MHz frequency intervals tuning			
XpressRoute
Availability	CPU supported	Other hardware	Particulars	Overclocking frequencies		
Availability	CPU supported	Other hardware	Particulars	Min.	Default	Max. possible
790FX, 790X	All AMD Processors (Socket AM2+/AM2 and Socket F+/F)	Radeon R580 and Radeon R600 based video cards	PCI-E clock overclocking, to accelerate data transfer to and from video cards by increasing PCI-E bandwidth	100 MHz	125 MHz	150-160 MHz
790FX, 790X	All AMD Processors (Socket AM2+/AM2 and Socket F+/F)	All CrossFire-enabled (software/hardware); Radeon video cards	Allowing point-to-point transfer between multiple-video card setup	—N/a		
790FX, 790X	HT 1.0-enabled processors (All K8-based processors, including Opteron 1000 series)	All Radeon video cards	Double pumping graphics data across the CPU HyperTransport link	—N/a		
MemBoost
Availability	CPU supported	Other hardware	Particulars			
790FX, 790X	All K8-based processors	DDR2-800 memory modules	Tweaking CAS latencies, as follows: tRC, tWR reduced by 2; tRRD, tWTR reduced by 1; tREF set to 7.8 μs from originally 3.9 μs; Enabling "Bank Swizzle Mode"; and Increase Bank Bypass Maximum to 7x			
790FX, 790X	All AMD processors (Socket AM2+/AM2 and Socket F+/F)	DDR2 memory modules	Disable the "PowerDown" mode of DRAM modules (setting the register to "0")			
790FX	All AMD processors (Socket AM2+/AM2 and Socket F+/F)	DDR2 memory modules	Read performance SPD settings of high-end modules and set as default, giving maximum performance			

=== Advanced Clock Calibration ===
Advanced clock calibration (ACC) is a feature originally available for Phenom families of processors, particularly for Black Edition ones, to increase the overclocking potential of the CPU. ACC is supported by the SB710 and the SB750 southbridges, and available through BIOS settings on some motherboards and AMD OverDrive utility.

It was later discovered that this functionality has the possibility of unlocking the supposedly disabled cores of some Phenom II X2/X3 processors. In normal cases, it is not possible to use or unlock any of those hidden cores because originally those cores were disabled: a technique called "chip harvesting" or "feature binning" used by AMD to sell parts with one or two defective cores which will cause system instability if not disabled.

The following are available through the Advanced Clock Calibration feature:

1. Auto or manual settings
2. Allow separate settings for each of the CPU cores
3. Allowed range: -12% to +12%
4. Possibility of unlocking AMD Phenom II X2/X3, AMD Athlon II X2/X3 and AMD Sempron locked cores / cache. (with BIOS support)

The principle of ACC is not publicly discussed by AMD but some third-party vendors, including ASUS (Core Unlocker) and Biostar (BIO-unlocKING) have had it for some time. Gigabyte has added this feature, called CPU Core Control, to many NB785/SB710 boards via BIOS update, and will be including this feature (now called Auto Unlock) in all of their 800 Series boards with the SB850 chip. On many of the boards, the feature is dependent on BIOS version. While NVIDIA also has a similar technology for its nForce 780a motherboards, called NVCC (NVIDIA Clock Calibration) with very similar functionality.

=== Energy efficiency ===
One of the major focus of the chipset series is the energy efficiency of the chipsets. The need for energy-efficient chipsets have risen since chipsets starts including more features and more PCI Express lanes, to provide better system scalability by using PCI-E add-on cards.

But one issue is that chipset circuitries were usually made on a larger fabrication process nodes compared with the latest CPU process node, making recent chipsets consume more and more power than their predecessors. Recent examples including the Intel X38 chipset Northbridge (MCH), labelling 26.5 W TDP with a maximum idle power of 12.3 W, which results in the usage of integrated heat spreader (IHS) design over the chip to help heat spread evenly, with ASUS even adding water cooling block directly on top of the heatsink of the X38 Northbridge as a part of the motherboard heatpipe system. Although the aforementioned figures may be small compared to the TDP figures of a performance CPU, there is a growing demand for computer systems with higher performance and lower power consumption. While Intel focuses only on the energy efficiency of its processors, NVIDIA's nForce 780i chipset requires an overall power consumption of 48 W with the northbridge, southbridge and the nForce 200 PCI-E bridge.

In response to this, all discrete northbridges of the chipset series were designed on a 65 nm CMOS process, manufactured by TSMC, aimed at lowering power consumptions of chipsets. According to internal testing and various reports, the Northbridge of the AMD 790FX chipset (RD790) runs at 3 W when idle, and maximum 10 W under load, nominal 8 W power consumption, the northbridge was seen on reference design of the AMD 790FX chipset with single passive cooling heatsink instead of connecting to heat pipes which are frequently used on current performance motherboard offers, the chipset on the whole (the combination of RD790 Northbridge and SB600 Southbridge) consumes nominally less than 15 W.

The integrated graphics northbridges were also benefited, as most of the IGP northbridges were made on 55 nm process manufactured by TSMC with the inclusion of ATI PowerPlay technology, allowing dynamically changing the core clock frequency to minimum 150 MHz. The 780G Northbridge, sporting DirectX 10 support, consumes only 11.4 W on full load, 0.94 watt when idle. This is also smaller than the TDP figures of the Intel G35 chipset Northbridge at 28 W with the maximum idle power of 11 W.

=== ATI Hybrid Graphics ===
The ATI Hybrid Graphics technology applies to all or some of the integrated graphics chipsets of this chipset series, technologies including Hybrid CrossFire X, SurroundView and PowerXpress. Reports confirmed that the 790GX IGP (codenamed RS780D) chipset will be able to handle dual video card and IGP as a CrossFire X setup. Hybrid Graphics are only available with 24xx, 34xx, & 42xx model ATI graphics cards.

=== I/O acceleration technologies ===
All chipsets paired with either SB700, SB710 or SB750 southbridge will support two I/O acceleration technologies, as listed below:

==== Hybrid Drives ====
The southbridges also support hybrid drives via SATA or supported ATA ports, which is compliant with the requirements of the Windows ReadyDrive technology, which is basically a conventional hard drive with an embedded NAND flash module.

==== HyperFlash ====
The HyperFlash, basically a NAND flash module on a card, originally planned as a device connected to the supported IDE/ATA 66/100/133 channel, to speed up system performance through the Windows ReadyBoost and Windows ReadyDrive functionality.

A HyperFlash module consists of two parts, the first part is a HyperFlash memory card which are flash memory chips on a small PCB (dimensions similar to a Canadian quarter 25¢, with diameter 23.88 mm, but rectangular in shape) with contacts similar to SO-DIMM modules. The other part is a flash controller on an ATA connector, with similar latches/socket ejectors as SO-DIMM sockets. The HyperFlash memory card is inserted into the flash controller and then directly plugged into the motherboard ATA connector. The memory chips used on the HyperFlash memory card will be Samsung's OneNAND flash memory modules with maximum four-die configuration (four-die in a single package), running at 83 MHz frequency, providing a bandwidth of 108 MB/s on a 16-bit bus width. Since the flash controller is designed to be compatible with ATA pin-out definitions (also to fit the ATA motherboard connector) and is designed by Molex, this allows OEMs to produce their own brands of HyperFlash modules while at the same time providing maximum compatibility between HyperFlash modules.

Three variants were reportedly available for HyperFlash modules, with capacity of 512 MiB, 1 GiB and 2 GiB respectively, with expected DVT samples in November 2007 and mass-production expected in December 2007 (supported by Beta motherboard drivers) and official motherboard driver support planned in February 2008. However, it was reportedly cancelled.

==== RAIDXpert ====
The RAIDXpert is a remote RAID configuration tool, for changing the RAID level of the RAID setup connected via SATA 3.0 Gbit/s ports (connected to SB600, excluding extra SATA 3.0 Gbit/s ports through additional SATA chip on some motherboard implementations), including RAID 0, RAID 1, and RAID 0+1.

=== Integrated graphics ===
Some of the members of the AMD 700 chipset series, specifically the 780 and 740 family of chipsets and the 790GX chipset, have integrated graphics onboard (IGP), as well as supporting hardware video playback acceleration at different levels. All IGP northbridges are pin-compatible to each other and even predecessors (690 series), to lower the product cost for each PCB redesign due to pin incompatibility and maximize the product lineup. These IGP features are listed below:

IGP features
Chipset/ Codename	Gfx model (Radeon)	DirectX API supported	IGP frequency	Video playback acceleration		Video formats decoding support			Multi-graphics	Other video features	Native video output support				SurroundView (Multi-display)
Chipset/ Codename	Gfx model (Radeon)	DirectX API supported	IGP frequency	AVIVO	AVIVO HD+ UVD+AVP	MPEG-2	H.264	VC-1	Multi-graphics	Other video features	DisplayPort (with DPCP)	HDMI 1.2a (with HDCP)	DVI (with HDCP)	D-Sub	SurroundView (Multi-display)
785E/RS785E	HD 4200	10.1		Yes	Yes, UVD 2	Yes	Full	Full	Hybrid CrossFire X	Dual video stream^{1}	Yes	Yes	Yes	Yes	Yes
785G/RS880	HD 4200	10.1	500 MHz	Yes	Yes, UVD 2	Yes	Full	Full	ATI Hybrid Graphics	Dual video stream^{1}	Yes	Yes	Yes	Yes	Yes
790GX/RS780D	HD 3300	10.0	700 MHz	Yes	Yes, UVD+	Partial	Full	Full	Hybrid CrossFire X	Dual video stream^{1}	Yes	Yes	Yes	Yes	Yes
780E/RS780E	HD 3200	10.0	500 MHz	Yes	Yes, UVD+	Partial	Full	Full	Hybrid CrossFire X	Dual video stream^{1}	Yes	Yes	Yes	Yes	Yes
780G/RS780	HD 3200	10.0	500 MHz	Yes	Yes, UVD+	Partial	Full	Full	ATI Hybrid Graphics	Dual video stream^{1}	Yes	Yes	Yes	Yes	Yes
780V/RS780C	3100	10.0	350 MHz	Yes	No	Partial	Partial	Partial	No	—N/a	No	Yes	Yes	Yes	Yes
760G/RS780L	3000	10.0	350 MHz	Yes	No	Partial	Partial	Partial	ATI Hybrid Graphics	—N/a	Depends	Depends	Yes	Yes	No
740G/RS740	2100	9.0		Yes	No	Partial	Partial	Partial	No	—N/a	No	Yes	Yes	Yes	No
Notes: 1. Dual video stream may include the following at a maximum total bitrate of 40 Mbit/s: 2 HD video streams OR; 1 HD video stream + 1 SD video stream + 1 HD audio stream 2. 760G supports DisplayPort and HDMI signals as video output, but actual implementation will depend on different motherboard designs.

=== "Remote IT" ===
For the enterprise platform, the "Remote IT" technology (temporary name) was reported to be released by the end of 2007 or early 2008. The platform composed of an AMD 780V chipset with an SB700 southbridge, and chips from Broadcom, Realtek and Marvell. It was reported to have incorporated the Broadcom BCM5761 managed NIC controller with Intelligent Platform Management Interface (IPMI) 1.5 manageability standard, together with DASH 1.0 specification (DASH page on DMTF) support of the SB700 and SB750 southbridges, and reported support additional management and security technologies such as IDM (Intelligent Device Management) and TPM 1.2 (Trusted Platform Module).

== Reception ==
In a comparison against the GeForce 8200, Anandtech considered the 780G "a better balanced chipset offering improved casual gaming performance, equal video quality, similar power requirements, greater availability, and better pricing." The 8200, however, was preferred as a single-purpose HTPC solution. Both chipsets were considered superior to Intel's G45/X4500HD, which was cited for a lack of driver quality and features, and a higher price.

== Northbridge issues (760G, M770, 780x, M780x, 790GX) ==
- All platforms:
  - Low speed instability with HyperTransport version 3 capable processors. HT3 speeds 1.2 GHz up to 1.6 GHz should not be used, only 1.8 up to 2.2 GHz speeds are safe to be used. HT3 processors operating at 1.6 GHz (Phenom X3 8250e, Phenom X4 9100e and Phenom X4 9150e) will suffer from high retry count on the HyperTransport link which may result in hangs on revision A12 northbridges.
- Windows platform:
  - Microsoft KB959345

== Southbridge issues (SB7x0) ==
Most OSes require patches in order to work reliably.

- Windows platform:
  - Microsoft KB982091
  - Microsoft KB956871
  - Microsoft KB953689
- Linux platform:
  - HPET operation with MSI causes LPC DMA corruption on devices using LPC DMA (floppy, parallel port, serial port in FIR mode) because MSI requests are misinterpreted as DMA cycles by the broken LPC controller
  - USB freeze when multiple devices are connected through hub (related to AMD Product Advisory PA_SB700AK1)
  - Erratic behaviour of the HPET when Spread Spectrum is enabled (related to AMD Product Advisory PA_SB700AG2)
  - Disabling legacy interrupts for SATA disables MSI too
  - SATA soft reset fails when PMP is enabled and attached devices will not be detected
  - SATA internal errors are ignored because the controller will set Serial ATA port Error when it should not

== See also ==
- AMD 800 chipset series
- AMD 900 chipset series
- nForce 700
- Advanced Micro Devices
- ATI Technologies
- Comparison of AMD chipsets
- Comparison of AMD graphics processing units
