= Radeon HD 2000 series =

Series of video cards

ATI Radeon HD 2000 series
- Release date: June 28, 2007; 19 years ago
- Codename: Radeon R600 series
- Architecture: TeraScale 1
- Transistors: 180M 65nm (RV610): 390M 65nm (RV630); 700M 80nm (R600)

Cards
- Entry-level: 2350, 2400
- Mid-range: 2600
- High-end: 2900

API support
- Direct3D: Direct3D 10.0; Shader Model 4.0
- OpenCL: Unsupported. Supports Close To Metal.
- OpenGL: OpenGL 3.3

History
- Predecessor: Radeon X1000 series
- Successor: Radeon HD 3000 series

Support status
- Unsupported

The graphics processing unit (GPU) codenamed Radeon R600 is the foundation of the Radeon HD 2000 series and the FireGL 2007 series video cards developed by ATI Technologies. The HD 2000 cards competed with nVidia's GeForce 8 series.

== Architecture ==
This article is about all products under the brand "Radeon HD 2000 Series". They all contain a GPU which implements TeraScale 1, ATI's first Unified shader model microarchitecture for PCs.

=== Video acceleration ===
The Unified Video Decoder (UVD) SIP core is on-die in the HD 2400 and the HD 2600. The HD 2900 GPU dies do not have a UVD core, as its stream processors were powerful enough to handle most of the steps of video acceleration in its stead except for entropy decoding and bitstream processing which are left for the CPU to perform.

=== Other features ===
HDTV encoding support is implemented via the integrated AMD Xilleon encoder; the companion Rage Theater chip used on the Radeon X1000 series was replaced with the digital Theater 200 chip, providing VIVO capabilities.

For display outputs, all variants include two dual-link TMDS transmitters, except for HD 2400 and HD 3400, which include one single and one dual-link TMDS transmitters. Each DVI output includes dual-link HDCP encoder with on-chip decipher key. HDMI was introduced, supporting display resolutions up to 1,920×1,080, with integrated HD audio controller with 5.1-channel LPCM and AC3 encoding support. Audio is transmitted via DVI port, with specially designed DVI-to-HDMI dongle for HDMI output that carries both audio and video.

All variants support CrossFireX technology. CrossFire efficiency was improved and shows performance approaching the theoretical maximum of twice the performance of a single card.

== Desktop products ==
The R600 family is called the Radeon HD 2000 series, with the enthusiast segment being the Radeon HD 2900 series which originally comprised the Radeon HD 2900 XT with GDDR3 memory released on May 14, and the higher-clocked GDDR4 version in early July.

The mainstream and budget segment products were the Radeon HD 2600 and Radeon HD 2400 series respectively, both launched June 28, 2007.

Previously there were no HD 2000 series products being offered in the performance segment while ATI used models from the previous generation to address that target market; this situation did not change until the release of variants of the Radeon HD 2900 series, the Radeon HD 2900 Pro and GT, which filled the gap of the performance market for a short period of time.

=== Radeon HD 2400 ===
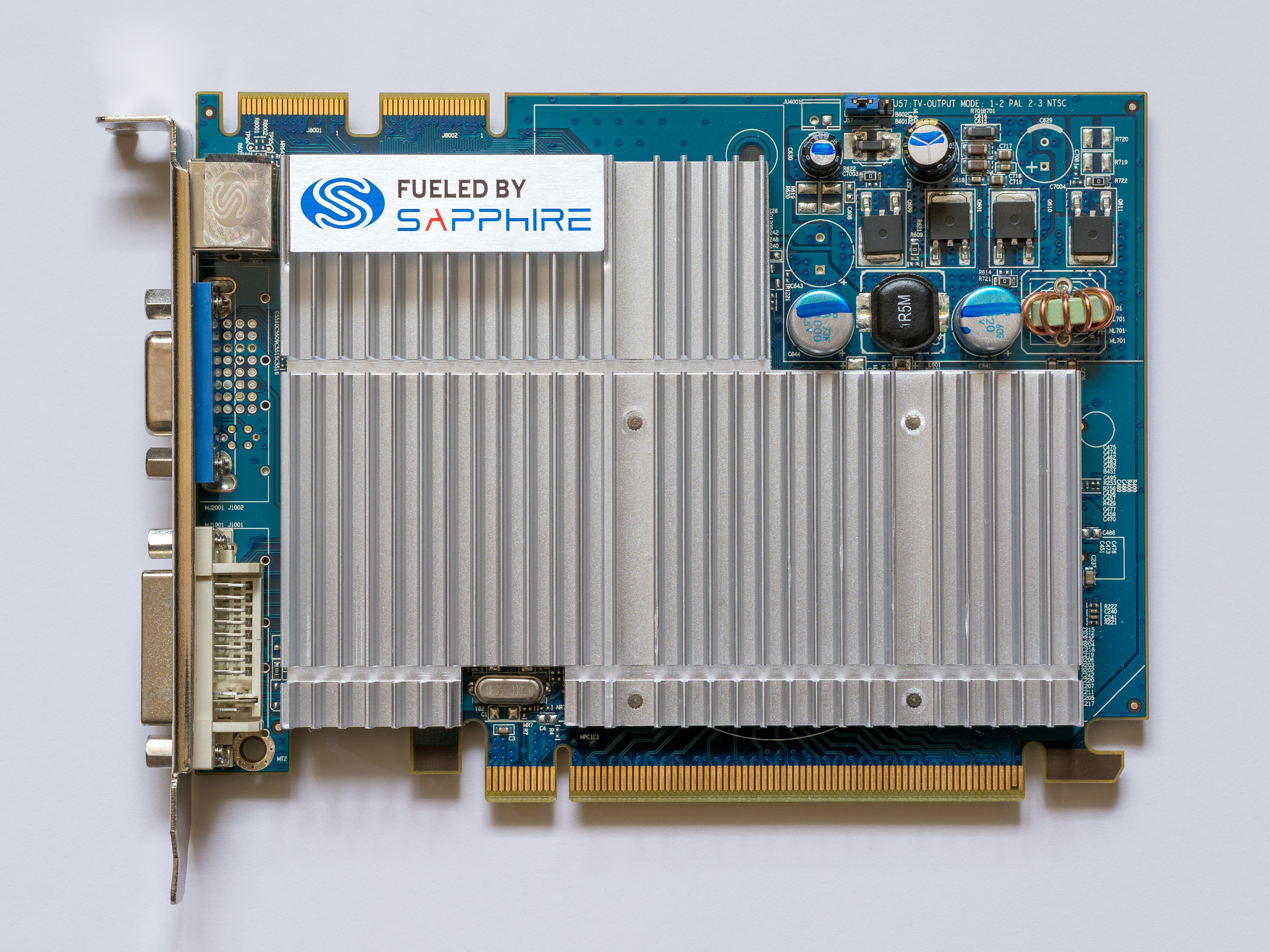
ATI Radeon HD 2400 XT

The Radeon HD 2400 series was based on the codenamed RV610 GPU. It had 180 million transistors on a 65 nm fabrication process. The Radeon HD 2400 series used a 64-bit-wide memory bus. The die size is 85 mm^{2}. The official PCB design implements only a passive-cooling heatsink instead of a fan, and official claims of power consumption are as little as 35 W. The core has 16 kiB unified vertex/texture cache away from dedicated vertex cache and L1/L2 texture cache used in higher end model.

Reports has that the first batch of the RV610 core (silicon revision A12), only being released to system builders, has a bug that hindered the UVD from working properly, but other parts of the die operated normally. Those products were officially supported with the release of Catalyst 7.10 driver, which the cards were named as Radeon HD 2350 series.

Several reports from owners of HD 2400 Pro suggest the card do not fully support hardware decoding for all H.264/VC-1 videos. The device driver, even with the latest stable version, seem to only honor hardware decoding for formats specified in the Blu-ray and HD-DVD specification. As a result of such restriction, the card is not deemed very useful for hardware video decoding since the majority of the H.264/VC-1 videos on the net are not encoded in those formats (even though the hardware itself is fully capable of doing such decoding work). This device driver restriction has led to the development of a third party driver patch, "ExDeus ATI HD Registry Tweak", to unlock the potential of HD 2400 Pro for full support of H.264/VC-1 hardware video decoding.

=== Radeon HD 2600 ===
The Radeon HD 2600 series was based on the codenamed RV630 GPU and packed 390 million transistors on a 65 nm fabrication process. The Radeon HD 2600-series video cards included GDDR3 support, a 128-bit memory ring bus and 4-phase digital PWM, spanning a die size of 153 mm^{2}. Neither of the GDDR3 reference PCI-E designs required additional power connectors whereas the HD 2600 Pro and XT AGP variants required additional power through either 4-pin or 6-pin power connectors, Official claims state that the Radeon HD 2600 series consumes as little as 45 W of power.

==== Radeon HD 2600 X2 ====
The Radeon HD 2600 X2 is a dual-GPU product which includes 2 RV630 dies on a single PCB with a PCI-E bridge splitting the PCI-E ×16 bandwidth into two groups of PCI-E ×8 lanes (each 2.0 Gbit/s). The card provides 4 DVI outputs or HDMI outputs via dongle and supports CrossFire configurations. AMD calls this product the Radeon HD 2600 X2 as seen by some vendors and as observed inside the INF file of Catalyst 7.9 version 8.411. Sapphire and other vendors including PowerColor and GeCube have either announced or demonstrated their respective dual GPU (connected by crossfire) products. Catalyst 7.9 added support for this hardware in September 2007. However, AMD did not provide much publicity to promote it. A vendor may offer cards containing 256 MiB, 512 MiB, or 1 GiB of video memory. Although the memory technology utilized is at a vendor's discretion, most vendors have opted for GDDR3 and DDR2 due to lower manufacturing cost and positioning of this product for the mainstream rather than performance market segment and also a big success.

=== Radeon HD 2900 ===
The Radeon HD 2900 series was based on the codenamed R600 GPU and was launched on May 14, 2007. R600 packed 700 million transistors on an 80 nm fabrication process and had a 420 mm^{2} die size. The Radeon HD 2900 XT was launched with 320 Stream Processors and a core clock of 743 MHz. The initial model was released with 512 MB of GDDR3 clocked at 828 MHz (1,656 MHz effective) with a 512-bit interface. A couple months after release ATI released the 1 GB GDDR4 model with a memory frequency of 1,000 MHz (2,000 MHz effective). Performance was on par compared to the 512 MB card. The HD 2900 XT introduced a lot of firsts. It was the first to implement a digital PWM on board (7-phase PWM), first to use an 8-pin PEG connector, and was the first graphics card from ATI to support DirectX 10.

The Radeon HD 2900 Pro was clocked lower at 600 MHz core and 800 MHz memory (1,600 MHz effective), configured with 512 MB of GDDR3 or 1 GB of GDDR4. It was rumored that some of the 1 GB GDDR4 models were manufactured using a 12" cooler borrowed from the prototype HD 2900 XTX. The HD 2900 Pro had both 256-bit and 512-bit interface options for the 512 MB versions of the card. A few AIB partners offered a black and silver cooler exclusive to the 256-bit model of the Pro.

The Radeon HD 2900 GT was a 240 Stream Processor variant clocked the same as the HD 2900 Pro, but with 256 MB of video memory on a 256-bit interface.

== Mobile products ==
All Mobility Radeon HD 2000 series share the same feature set support as their desktop counterparts, as well as the addition of the battery-conserving PowerPlay 7.0 features, which are augmented from the previous generation's PowerPlay 6.0.

The Mobility Radeon HD 2300 is a budget product which includes UVD in silica but lacks unified shader architecture and DirectX 10.0/SM 4.0 support, limiting support to DirectX 9.0c/SM 3.0 using the more traditional architecture of the previous generation. A high-end variant, the Mobility Radeon HD 2700, with higher core and memory frequencies than the Mobility Radeon HD 2600, was released in mid-December 2007.

The Mobility Radeon HD 2400 is offered in two model variants; the standard HD 2400 and the HD 2400 XT.

The Mobility Radeon HD 2600 is also available in the same two flavors; the plain HD 2600 and, at the top of the mobility lineup, the HD 2600 XT.

The half-generation update treatment had also applied to mobile products. Announced prior to CES 2008 was the Mobility Radeon HD 3000 series. Released in the first quarter of 2008, the Mobility Radeon HD 3000 series consisted of two families, the Mobility Radeon HD 3400 series and the Mobility Radeon HD 3600 series. The Mobility Radeon HD 3600 series also featured the industry's first implementation of on-board 128-bit GDDR4 memory.

About the time of late March to early April, 2008, AMD renewed the device ID list on its website with the inclusion of Mobility Radeon HD 3850 X2 and Mobility Radeon HD 3870 X2 and their respective device IDs. Later in Spring IDF 2008 held in Shanghai, a development board of the Mobility Radeon HD 3870 X2 was demonstrated alongside a Centrino 2 platform demonstration system. The Mobility Radeon HD 3870 X2 was based on two M88 GPUs with the addition of a PCI Express switch chip on a single PCB. The development board used for demonstration was a PCI Express 2.0 ×16 card, while the final product is expected to be on AXIOM/MXM modules.

== Chipset table ==
Model	Launch	Code name	Fab (nm)	Transistors (million)	Die size (mm^{2})	Bus interface	Clock rate		Core config	Fillrate		Memory				Processing power (GFLOPS)		TDP (Watts)	Crossfire support	API support (version)			Release price (USD)
Model	Launch	Code name	Fab (nm)	Transistors (million)	Die size (mm^{2})	Bus interface	Core (MHz)	Memory (MHz)	Core config	Pixel (GP/s)	Texture (GT/s)	Size (MB)	Bandwidth (GB/s)	Bus type	Bus width (Bit)	Single precision	Double precision	Max.	Crossfire support	Direct3D	OpenGL	OpenCL	Release price (USD)
Radeon HD 2350	June 28, 2007	RV610	65	180	85	PCIe 1.0 ×16	525	400	40:4:4	2.10	2.10	64 onboard + up to 256 system	3.20	DDR2	32	42.0	—N/a	20	No	10.0	3.3	APP Stream Only	?
Radeon HD 2400 PRO	June 28, 2007	RV610	65	180	85	PCIe 1.0 ×16; AGP; PCI	525	400	40:4:4	2.10	2.10	128; 256; 512	6.40	DDR2	64	42.0	—N/a	20	No	10.0	3.3	APP Stream Only	$50–55
Radeon HD 2400 XT	June 28, 2007	RV610	65	180	85	PCIe 1.0 ×16	650	500; 700	40:4:4	2.60	2.60	256	8.0; 11.2	DDR2; GDDR3	64	52.0	—N/a	25	No	10.0	3.3	APP Stream Only	$75–85
Radeon HD 2600 PRO	June 28, 2007	RV630	65	390	153	PCIe 1.0 ×16; AGP	600	500; 700	120:8:4	2.40	4.80	256; 512	16.0; 22.4	DDR2; GDDR3	128	144.0	—N/a	35	No	10.0	3.3	APP Stream Only	$89–99
Radeon HD 2600 XT	June 28, 2007	RV630	65	390	153	PCIe 1.0 ×16; AGP	800	800; 1100	120:8:4	3.20	6.40	256; 512	25.6; 35.2	GDDR3; GDDR4	128	192.0	—N/a	45; 50	4-way CrossFire	10.0	3.3	APP Stream Only	$119 (GDDR3) $149 (GDDR4)
Radeon HD 2900 GT	November 6, 2007	R600 GT	80	720	420	PCIe 1.0 ×16	601	800	240:12:12	7.21	7.21	256; 512	51.2	GDDR3	256	288.5	—N/a	150	4-way CrossFire	10.0	3.3	APP Stream Only	$200
Radeon HD 2900 PRO	September 25, 2007	R600 PRO	80	720	420	PCIe 1.0 ×16	600	800; 925	320:16:16	9.6	9.6	512; 1024	51.2; 102.4; 118.4	GDDR3; GDDR4	256; 512	384.0	—N/a	200	4-way CrossFire	10.0	3.3	APP Stream Only	$250 (GDDR3) $300 (GDDR4)
Radeon HD 2900 XT	May 14, 2007	R600 XT	80	720	420	PCIe 1.0 ×16	743	828; 1000	320:16:16	11.9	11.9	512; 1024	105.6; 128.0	GDDR3; GDDR4	512	475.5	—N/a	215	4-way CrossFire	10.0	3.3	APP Stream Only	$399

=== Mobility Radeon ===
OpenGL 3.3 is possible with latest drivers for all RV6xx.

Model	Launch	Model number	Code name	Fab (nm)	Bus interface	Core clock (MHz)	Memory clock (MHz)	Core config	Fillrate		Memory				API compliance (version)		Processing power (GFLOPS)	Notes
Model	Launch	Model number	Code name	Fab (nm)	Bus interface	Core clock (MHz)	Memory clock (MHz)	Core config	Pixel (GP/s)	Texture (GT/s)	Size (MB)	Bandwidth (GB/s)	Bus type	Bus width (bit)	Direct3D	OpenGL	Processing power (GFLOPS)	Notes
Mobility Radeon X2300	March 1, 2007	M64	RV515	90	PCIe ×16	480	400	2:4:4:4^{1}	1.92	1.92	128	6.4; 12.8	DDR; DDR2; GDDR3	64; 128	9.0c	2.0	Unknown	renamed product, HyperMemory, no UVD, PowerPlay 6.0
Mobility Radeon X2500	June 1, 2007	M66	RV530	90	PCIe ×16	460	400	5:12:4:4^{1}	1.84	1.84	256	12.8	DDR; DDR2; GDDR3	128	9.0c	2.0	Unknown	based on X1600/1700, HM up to 768 Mb, no UVD, PowerPlay 6.0
Mobility Radeon HD 2300	March 1, 2007	M71	RV515	90	PCIe ×16	480	400	2:4:4:4^{1}	1.92	1.92	128; 256; 512	6.4; 12.8	DDR; DDR2; GDDR3	64; 128	9.0c	2.0	Unknown	same as X2300, but with UVD, PowerPlay 6.0
Mobility Radeon HD 2400	May 14, 2007	M72S	RV610	65	PCIe ×16	450	400	40:4:4^{2}	1.8	1.8	256+ Hyper Memory	6.4	DDR2	64	10.0	2.0 (3.3)	36	UVD, PowerPlay 7.0
Mobility Radeon HD 2400 XT	May 14, 2007	M72M	RV610	65	PCIe ×16	600; 600	400; 700	40:4:4^{2}	2.4	2.4	256+ Hyper Memory	6.4; 11.2	DDR2; GDDR3	64	10.0	2.0 (3.3)	48	UVD, PowerPlay 7.0
Mobility Radeon HD 2600	May 14, 2007	M76M	RV630	65	PCIe ×16	500; 500	400; 600	120:8:4^{2}	2.0	4.0	256+ Hyper Memory	12.8; 19.2	DDR2; GDDR3	128	10.0	2.0 (3.3)	120	UVD, PowerPlay 7.0
Mobility Radeon HD 2600 XT	May 14, 2007	M76XT	RV630	65	PCIe ×16	680	750	120:8:4^{2}	2.72	5.44	256+ Hyper Memory	24	GDDR3	128	10.0	2.0 (3.3)	168	UVD, PowerPlay 7.0
Mobility Radeon HD 2700	December 12, 2007	M76	RV630	65	PCIe ×16	650	700	120:8:4^{2}	2.6	5.2	256+ Hyper Memory (total 768)	22.4	GDDR3	128	10.0	2.0 (3.3)	168	UVD, PowerPlay 7.0

^{1} Vertex shaders : Pixel shaders : Texture mapping units : Render output units.
^{2} Unified Shaderss : Texture mapping units : Render output units

== Radeon feature matrix ==
The following table shows features of AMD/ATI's GPUs (see also: List of AMD graphics processing units).

Name of GPU series	Wonder	Mach	3D Rage	Rage Pro	Rage 128	R100	R200	R300	R400	R500	R600	RV670	R700	Evergreen	Northern Islands		Southern Islands	Sea Islands	Volcanic Islands	Arctic Islands/Polaris	Vega	Navi 1x	Navi 2x	Navi 3x	Navi 4x
Released	1986	1991	Apr; 1996	Mar; 1997	Aug; 1998	Apr; 2000	Aug; 2001	Sep; 2002	May; 2004	Oct; 2005	May; 2007	Nov; 2007	Jun; 2008	Sep; 2009	Oct; 2010	Dec; 2010	Jan; 2012	Sep; 2013	Jun; 2015	Jun 2016, Apr 2017, Aug 2019	Jun 2017, Feb 2019	Jul; 2019	Nov; 2020	Dec; 2022	Feb; 2025
Marketing Name	Wonder	Mach	3D; Rage	Rage; Pro	Rage; 128	Radeon; 7000	Radeon; 8000	Radeon; 9000	Radeon; X700/X800	Radeon; X1000	Radeon; HD 2000	Radeon; HD 3000	Radeon; HD 4000	Radeon; HD 5000	Radeon; HD 6000		Radeon; HD 7000	Radeon; 200	Radeon; 300	Radeon; 400/500/600	Radeon; RX Vega, Radeon VII	Radeon; RX 5000	Radeon; RX 6000	Radeon; RX 7000	Radeon; RX 9000
AMD support	Ended																			Current					
Kind	2D		3D																						
Instruction set architecture	Not publicly known									Multiple (Note: R500 has two instruction sets. Vertex shader cores: "PVS instruction set". Pixel shader cores: "US instruction set".)	TeraScale instruction set						GCN instruction set					RDNA instruction set			
Microarchitecture	Not publicly known					GFX1		GFX2			TeraScale 1 (VLIW5) (GFX3)			TeraScale 2 (VLIW5) (GFX4)	TeraScale 2 (VLIW5) up to 68xx (GFX4)	TeraScale 3 (VLIW4) in 69xx (GFX5)	GCN 1st gen (GFX6)	GCN 2nd gen (GFX7)	GCN 3rd gen (GFX8)	GCN 4th gen (GFX8)	GCN 5th gen (GFX9)	RDNA (GFX10.1)	RDNA 2 (GFX10.3)	RDNA 3 (GFX11)	RDNA 4 (GFX12)
Type	Fixed pipeline (Note: The Radeon R100 Series has programmable pixel shaders, but do not fully comply with DirectX 8 or Pixel Shader 1.0. See article on R100's pixel shaders.)						Programmable pixel & vertex pipelines				Unified shader model														
Direct3D	—N/a		5.0	6.0		7.0	8.1	9.0; 11 (9_2)	9.0b 11 (9_2)	9.0c 11 (9_3)	10.0; 11 (10_0)	10.1; 11 (10_1)		11 (11_0)			11 (11_1); 12 (11_1)	11 (12_0); 12 (12_0)			11 (12_1); 12 (12_1)		11 (12_1); 12 (12_2)		
Shader model	—N/a						1.4	2.0+	2.0b	3.0	4.0	4.1		5.0			5.1	5.1; 6.5			6.7				6.8
OpenGL	—N/a			1.1	1.2	1.3		1.5 (Note: R300, R400 and R500 based cards do not fully comply with OpenGL 2+ as the hardware does not support all types of non-power of two (NPOT) textures.)			3.3			4.5 (Windows), 4.6 (Linux Mesa 25.2+)			4.6 (Note: OpenGL 4+ compliance requires supporting FP64 shaders and these are emulated on some TeraScale chips using 32-bit hardware.)								
Vulkan	—N/a															1.1 (Note: Vulkan support is theoretically possible but has not been implemented in a stable driver.)	1.3 (Note: Vulkan support in Linux relies on the AMDgpu kernel driver, the radeon driver does not support Vulkan.)		1.4						
OpenCL	—N/a										Close to Metal		1.1 (not supported by Mesa)	1.2+ (on Linux: 1.1+ (no Image support on Clover, with Rusticl) with Mesa, 1.2+ on GCN 1.Gen)				2.0+ (Adrenalin driver on Win 7+) (on Linux ROCm, Mesa 1.2+ (no support in Clover, only Rusticl, Mesa, 2.0+ and 3.0 with AMD drivers or AMD ROCm), 5th gen: 2.2 win 10+ and Linux RocM 5.0+				2.2+ and 3.0 Windows 8.1+ and Linux ROCm 5.0+ (Mesa Rusticl 1.2+ and 3.0 (2.1+ and 2.2+))			
HSA / ROCm	—N/a																Yes					?			
Video decoding ASIC	—N/a										Avivo/UVD	UVD+	UVD 2	UVD 2.2	UVD 3		UVD 4	UVD 4.2	UVD 5.0 or 6.0	UVD 6.3	UVD 7 (Note: The UVD and VCE were replaced by the Video Core Next (VCN) ASIC in the Raven Ridge APU implementation of Vega.)	VCN 2.0	VCN 3.0	VCN 4.0	VCN 5.0
Video encoding ASIC	—N/a																VCE 1.0	VCE 2.0	VCE 3.0 or 3.1	VCE 3.4	VCE 4.0	VCN 2.0	VCN 3.0	VCN 4.0	VCN 5.0
Fluid Motion (Note: Video processing for video frame rate interpolation technique. In Windows it works as a DirectShow filter in your player. In Linux, there is no support on the part of drivers and / or community.)	No																	Yes				No		?	
Power saving	?										PowerPlay				PowerTune		PowerTune & ZeroCore Power					?			
TrueAudio	—N/a																	Via dedicated DSP		Via shaders					
FreeSync	—N/a																	1; 2							
HDCP (Note: To play protected video content, it also requires card, operating system, driver, and application support. A compatible HDCP display is also needed for this. HDCP is mandatory for the output of certain audio formats, placing additional constraints on the multimedia setup.)	—N/a										?							1.4		2.2		2.3			
PlayReady	—N/a																			3.0	No	3.0			
Supported displays (Note: More displays may be supported with native DisplayPort connections, or splitting the maximum resolution between multiple monitors with active converters.)						1–2	2							2–6								?			4
Max. resolution	?													2–6 × 2560×1600			2–6 × 4096×2160 @ 30 Hz			2–6 × 5120×2880 @ 60 Hz	3 × 7680×4320 @ 60 Hz	7680×4320 @ 60 Hz PowerColor		7680x4320 @165 Hz	7680x4320
/drm/radeon (Note: DRM (Direct Rendering Manager) is a component of the Linux kernel. AMDgpu is the Linux kernel module. Support in this table refers to the most current version.)						Yes													—N/a						
/drm/amdgpu	—N/a																Yes Kernel 6.19+		Yes						

== Graphics device drivers ==
=== AMD's proprietary graphics device driver "Catalyst" ===
AMD Catalyst is being developed for Microsoft Windows and Linux. As of July 2014, other operating system are not officially supported. This may be different for the AMD FirePro brand, which is based on identical hardware but features OpenGL-certified graphics device drivers.

AMD Catalyst supports of course all features advertised for the Radeon brand.

==== Microsoft Windows ====
The Purple Pill tool issue, which could allow unsigned drivers to be loaded into Windows Vista and tamper with the operating system kernel, was resolved in the Catalyst 7.8 release (version 8.401). The AVIVO video converter for Windows Vista, and color temperature control in Catalyst Control Center was added with the release of Catalyst 7.9, package version 8.411. Software CrossFire was enabled for HD 2600 and HD 2400 series video cards with the release of Catalyst 7.10 (package version 8.421)

The Catalyst 8.1, package version 8.451, supports for MultiView technology for accelerated OpenGL rendering on multiple video card setup (CrossFire). The driver also allows CrossFire configurations for Radeon HD 3850 and HD 3870 video cards.

The Catalyst 8.3 is described by AMD as a milestone release, supporting DirectX 10.1, ATI CrossFire X technology and allowing the mixing of different Radeon HD 3800 series video cards to form a CrossFire X setup with 2 to 4 GPUs. Catalyst 8.3 introduced to new video controls to further enhance the video playback quality, these controls includes edge enhancement and noise reduction settings. There is also the support for extended desktop in CrossFire X mode. The anti-aliasing support for Unreal Engine 3.0 in DirectX 9.0 games, support for CFAA filters (wide tent and box tent) to be enabled when Super AA is enabled, and other features as developer support for hardware surface tessellation, hardware accelerated wide aspect ratio LCD scaling, HydraVision support for Windows Vista allowing to add maximum 9 virtual desktops and new Folding@home client are also officially supported in this release.

The Catalyst 8.5, package version 8.493 brought new features include component video with 480i and 480p resolutions, SECAM TV output support, 1080p HDTV custom mode via HDMI, 1080p24 (1080p resolution at 24 Hz) support, HDMI Audio for non-standard TV modes (CEA 861b), support for adaptive anti-aliasing (and later, in Catalyst 8.6, also support for custom filters) under OpenGL, Windows XP SP3 support and un-install utility enhancements. The driver also includes performance improvements and fixes some instability issues and rendering issues on some games.

The Radeon HD 2000 series has been transitioned to legacy support, where drivers will be updated only to fix bugs instead of being optimized for new applications.

Current Catalyst drivers do not support the AGP versions of Radeon HD 2000/3000 series cards with RIALTO bridge. Installing Catalyst drivers on those cards will yield the following error message: "setup did not find a driver compatible with your current hardware or operating system." or simply fail outright. The AGP cards in question are supported unofficially by ATI/AMD with a hot-fixed Catalyst driver-set each month since May 2008 with the Catalyst 8.5 hotfix. Their PCI vendor IDs are listed below:

GPU core	Product	PCI device ID
RV610	Radeon HD 2400 Pro	94C4
RV630	Radeon HD 2600 Pro	9587
RV630	Radeon HD 2600 XT	9586

=== Free and open-source graphics device driver "Radeon" ===
The free and open-source drivers are primarily developed on Linux and for Linux, but have been ported to other operating systems as well. Each driver is composed out of five parts:

1. Linux kernel component Direct Rendering Manager (DRM)
2. Linux kernel component KMS driver: basically the device driver for the display controller
3. user-space component libDRM
4. user-space component in Mesa 3D;
5. a special and distinct 2D graphics device driver for X.Org Server, which if finally about to be replaced by Glamor

The free and open-source "Radeon" graphics driver supports most of the features implemented into the Radeon line of GPUs.

==== Documentation release ====
The free and open-source "Radeon" graphics device drivers are not reverse engineered, but based on documentation released by AMD.

Initial register documentation and parser code to execute the AtomBIOS ROM routines were released in September 2007. The R600 family Instruction Set Architecture guide was released on June 11, 2008. Sample code and register headers for the R600 and R700 3D engines were released in December 2008. AMD released the specifications for both the r6xx and r7xx families on January 26, 2009.

== See also ==
- List of AMD graphics processing units
