= AMD 800 chipset series =

Series of chipsets by AMD

- CPU supported: future Opteron, Phenom, Athlon (X2, X3, X4); Sempron and Turion Ultra processors
- Socket supported: Socket F+, Socket G34 (server); Socket AM3 (desktop); Socket FS1 (mobile)
- Southbridges: SB850, SB810, SB820M (mobile and embedded); SP5100 (server)

Server chipsets
- Uni-processor (1P): SR5580
- Not known: SR5690, SR5670

Desktop / mobile chipsets
- Enthusiast segment: 890FX
- Performance segment: 890GX
- Mainstream segment: 870, 880G

Miscellaneous
- Release date: March 2, 2010 (890GX)
- IGP Direct3D support: 10.1 (880G, 890GX)
- Predecessor: AMD 700 chipset series
- Successor: AMD 900 chipset series

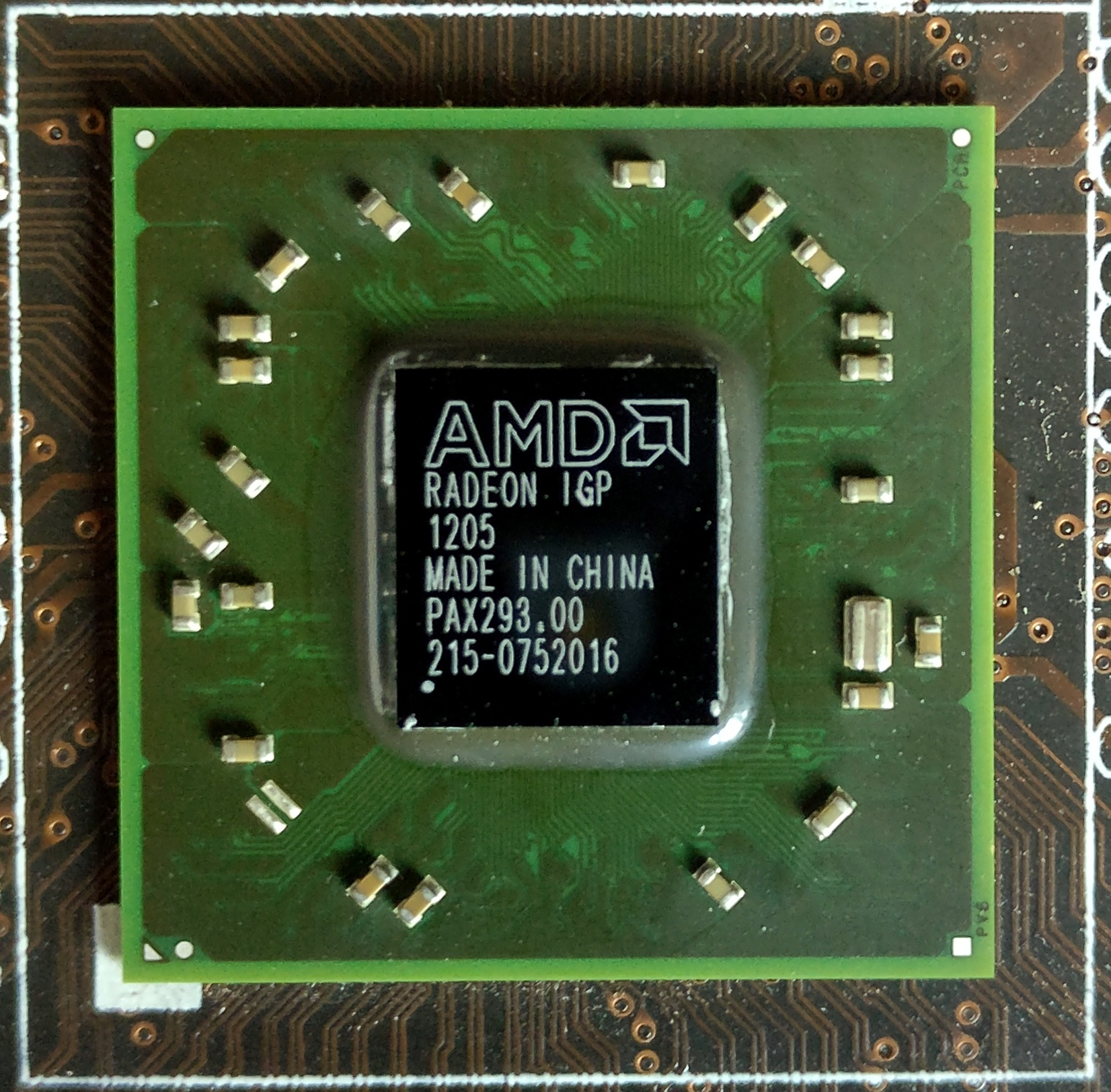

The AMD 800 chipset series is a set of chipsets developed by AMD, released in 2009. The chipset series was revealed in its presentation slides during the AMD Financial Analyst Day 2007 held on December 13, 2007. This chipset series also marks the return of AMD to the workstation/server market after the completion of the ATI acquisition in October 2006 with the first server chipsets.

== Lineup ==
=== Server ===
The chipset series is targeted in three markets: the workstation/server market, the desktop market and the notebook market. Current information about the chipset series is very scarce, while the officially published information about the series is the server chipsets with two variants available, the AMD 890S chipset and the AMD 870S chipset, all of them paired with the SB700S series southbridge. The chipsets were supposed to support the codenamed "Montreal" processor made on 45 nm process, in Socket G3 package, supporting both unbuffered or buffered DDR3 (with Socket G3MX), HyperTransport 3.0 and IOMMU, all of them forming the codenamed "Piranha" server platform. However, as a result of shifted strategy, AMD abandoned plans for Socket G3 and G3MX completely and focused to deliver new server platforms. Also for uni-processor server platform, the combination of SR5580 (Originally codenamed "RS780") and SP5100 formed the codenamed "Catalunya" platform.

The codenamed "Fiorano" platform consists of codenamed "Istanbul" six-core processors, while "Istanbul" processors still feature Socket F+ and support dual-channel registered DDR2 memory, the platform supports HyperTransport 3.0 and IOMMU.

The codenamed "Maranello" platform consists of six-core "Sao Paulo" or twelve-core "Magny-Cours" processors. These two processors support a new socket called Socket G34 with four-channel DDR3 support, with other platform features such as HyperTransport 3.0 and IOMMU support.

The codenamed "Catalunya" platform consists of codenamed "Suzuka" quad-core processors, featuring Socket AM3 and support dual-channel registered DDR3 memory, the platform supports HyperTransport 3.0.

The codenames of the chipsets "RD890S", "RD870S" and "SB700S" has also changed to "SR5690", "SR5670" and "SP5100".

=== Desktop and Mobile ===
==== 890FX ====
- Codenamed RD890
- Single AMD processor configuration
- Four physical PCIe 2.0 x16 slots @ x8 electrical which can be combined to create two PCIe 2.0 x16 slots @ x16 electrical, one PCIe 2.0 x4 slot and 6 PCIe 2.0 x1 slots, the chipset provides a total of 42 PCIe 2.0 lanes and 4 PCIe 2.0 for A-Link Express III solely in the Northbridge
- HyperTransport 3.0 and PCI Express 2.0
- ATI CrossFireX
- AMD OverDrive
- IOMMU
- Pairs with SB850 southbridge with support up to six SATA 6.0 Gbit/s ports
- Enthusiast discrete multi-graphics segment

==== 890GX ====
- Codenamed RS880D
- Single AMD processor configuration
- Two physical PCIe 2.0 x16 slots (one @ x16 or two @ x8 in Crossfire mode), one PCIe 2.0 x4 slot and two PCIe 2.0 x1 slots, the chipset provides a total of 22 PCIe 2.0 lanes and 4 PCIe 2.0 for A-Link Express III solely in the Northbridge
- Integrated graphics: Radeon HD 4290
  - Side-port memory as local framebuffer, supporting DDR3 chips up to DDR3-1333.
  - ATI PowerPlay technology
- Two physical PCI-E x16 slots (one 16x and one 8x electrically. In Crossfire mode, both will revert to 8x electrically)
- HyperTransport 3.0 and PCI Express 2.0
- ATI CrossFire
  - Hybrid CrossFireX
- AMD OverDrive
- Performance hybrid multi-graphics segment

==== 880G ====
- Codenamed RS880
- Single AMD processor configuration
- One physical PCIe 2.0 x16 slot, one PCIe 2.0 x4 slot and two PCIe 2.0 x1 slots, the chipset provides a total of 22 PCIe 2.0 lanes and 4 PCIe 2.0 for A-Link Express III solely in the Northbridge
- Integrated graphics: Radeon HD 4250
  - Side-port memory as local framebuffer, supporting DDR3 modules up to DDR3-1333.
  - ATI PowerPlay 7.0 technology
- HyperTransport 3.0 and PCI Express 2.0
- ATI CrossFire
  - Hybrid CrossFireX

==== 870 ====
- Codenamed RX880
- Single AMD processor configuration
- One physical PCIe 2.0 x16 slot, one PCIe 2.0 x4 slot and two PCIe 2.0 x1 slots, the chipset provides a total of 22 PCIe 2.0 lanes and 4 PCIe 2.0 for A-Link Express III solely in the Northbridge
- HyperTransport 3.0 and PCI Express 2.0

=== Southbridges ===
While in the same internal event mentioned above, AMD gave a preview on the features of the SB8xx family of southbridges, as follows:

- "A-Link Express 3.0" now uses four PCI Express 2.0 lanes, providing 2 GB/s bandwidth
- Supports C6 power state, which is featured in Fusion processors
- Incorporates a Gigabit Ethernet MAC
- Supports an integrated clock generator as an optional feature
- Support for AHCI 1.2 with SATA FIS–based switching support
- Mandatory support for SATA 1.5 Gbit/s, 3.0 Gbit/s, and SATA 6.0 Gbit/s (no support for Sata 6.0 Gbit/s in SB810)
- Two embedded 8051 controllers, and one dedicated for DASH compliance
- Support for 14 USB 2.0 ports, 2 USB 1.1 ports, and 3 integrated EHCI controllers (no support for USB 3.0 in initial products)
- Supports 5 fan controls, 8 V_{in} and 4 Temp_{in} for hardware monitoring

== Features ==
=== Desktop comparison matrix ===
Northbridge	Socket Support	Processor Support	Fabrication process (nm)	TDP	HyperTransport 3.0	IOMMU	CrossFireX Enabled	Integrated Graphics	IGP Frequency	PCI Express 2.0	NB-SB Interface
890FX	Socket AM3	Phenom II family, Athlon II family, Sempron	65 nm	19.6 W	2600 MHz bi-directional	Yes^{1}	Yes	None	—N/a	42 lanes	A-Link; Express III
890GX	Socket AM3	Phenom II family, Athlon II family, Sempron	55 nm	25 W	2600 MHz bi-directional	No	Yes	Radeon HD 4290	700 MHz	22 lanes	A-Link; Express III
880G	Socket AM3	Phenom II family, Athlon II family, Sempron	55 nm	18 W	2600 MHz bi-directional	No	Yes	Radeon HD 4250	560 MHz	22 lanes	A-Link; Express III
870	Socket AM3	Phenom II family, Athlon II family, Sempron	65 nm	12.5 W	2600 MHz bi-directional	No	No	None	—N/a	22 lanes	A-Link; Express III
Notes: 1. Full IOMMU functionality requires a BIOS with an ACPI IVRS table present. Currently only some 890FX motherboards provide an IVRS table: ASRock 890FX Deluxe3; ASRock 890FX Deluxe4; ASUS Crosshair IV; ASUS M4A89TD Pro; ASUS M4A89TD Pro/USB3; Biostar TA890FXE(latest BIOS required); Gigabyte GA-890FXA-UD5 (from Gigabyte Tech Support: use Bios ver F5 or higher, Board Rev 3.0 or higher); Gigabyte GA-890FXA-UD7 (beta-bios available from tech-support); MSI 890FXA-GD70 (from bios 1.7 and greater)

=== Integrated graphics ===
Some members of the AMD 800 chipset series, the 880G and the 890GX have integrated graphics (IGP) that support hardware video playback acceleration at different levels. The IGP features are listed below:

IGP features
Chipset/ Codename	iGPU model (Radeon)	Rendering APIs		Video decompression^{1}				Multi-graphics	Native video output support			
Chipset/ Codename	iGPU model (Radeon)	Direct3D	OpenGL	MPEG-2	H.264	VC-1	Other video features	Multi-graphics	DisplayPort (with DPCP)	HDMI 1.3a (with HDCP)	DVI (with HDCP)	D-Sub
890GX/RS880D	HD 4290	10.1	3.3	Full	Full	Full	Dual video stream^{2}	ATI Hybrid CrossFireX	Yes	Yes	Yes	Yes
880G/RS880P	HD 4250	10.1	3.3	Full	Full	Full	Dual video stream^{2}	ATI Hybrid CrossFireX	Yes	Yes	Yes	Yes
RS880M series	HD 4270; HD 4250; HD 4225	10.1	3.3	Full	Full	Full	Dual video stream^{2}	No	Yes	Yes	Yes	Yes
Notes: 1. The calculation of the decompression is done fully or partially by some ASIC, which is part of the chipset. Brands for this ASICs are AVIVO and Unified Video Decoder (UVD); 2. Dual video stream may include the following at a maximum total bitrate of 40 Mbit/s: 2 HD video streams OR; 1 HD video stream + 1 SD video stream + 1 HD audio stream

== Southbridge issues (SB8x0) ==
AMD does not provide any SB8x0 errata publicly. Most OSes require patches in order to work reliably.

- Windows platform:
  - Microsoft KB982091
- Linux platform:
  - HPET operation with MSI causes LPC DMA corruption on devices using LPC DMA (floppy, parallel port, serial port in FIR mode) because MSI requests are misinterpreted as DMA cycles by the broken LPC controller
  - SATA soft reset fails when PMP is enabled and attached devices will not be detected

== See also ==
- AMD 700 chipset series
- AMD 900 chipset series
- List of AMD chipsets
