= ATI Multi Rendering =

ATI Technologies-made video tech enabling computers to use multiple processors at once

ATI Multi-Rendering (AMR) is a video technology created by ATI Technologies that enables a single computer to use more than one video processor.

Created in 2002, AMR uses a technology ATI calls "Super Tiling" to connect multiple (two or more) video cards together. AMR has been primarily used by Evans and Sutherland, for commercial flight simulators, because of its ability to use more than two VPUs. ATI has introduced a "consumer level" version of AMR, which they refer to as CrossFire.

== Super Tiling ==
Super Tiling is a technology that splits the screen up into equal divisions whose size is based on the number of VPUs. These divisions are called tiles. The partial images are then put together and displayed on the screen. Although not much is known about the interconnect method, it may be a device that bridges the cards together in a method similar to nVidia's SLI bridge card, or it may pass data over unused PCIe ports (as each card will be on a 16X slot, but will only be working at 8X interconnect rates)

== Release ==
The official name of AMR's commercial variant is ATI CrossFire. The chipset was launched with ATI's R520 core for Intel and AMD platforms in the summer of 2005.

== See also ==
- AMD CrossFireX
- Nvidia Scalable Link Interface
- Scan-Line Interleave
