= AMD Hybrid Graphics =

Line of discrete and integrated graphics processing units

Sticker/badge featured on AMD APU+GPU compatible computers

AMD Hybrid Graphics technology was a collective brand from AMD for features of its Radeon line of discrete and integrated GPUs, promoting higher performance and productivity while reducing energy consumption.

The technology previously applied to selected chipsets of the AMD 700 chipset series and AMD 800 chipset series only.

The technology was announced as ATI Hybrid Graphics on January 23, 2008, with Radeon HD 2400 series and Radeon HD 3400 series video cards supporting hybrid graphics functionality. Originally, ATI announced this feature would only be supported in Vista, but in August 2008 they added support to their Windows XP drivers. The architecture was patented by ATI in 2005. The previous generation of Hybrid Crossfire paired 890GX or 880G (with Radeon HD4290 and HD 4250 respectively) motherboards from the AMD 800 chipset series with an HD 5450, 5550, 5570 or 5670 Radeon video card from the Radeon HD 5000 series. Newer information suggests that A6-series and A8-series AMD APUs can be used in Hybrid Crossfire (subsequently called "Dual Graphics") with HD 6570/6670 video cards. Dual-graphic-capable second-generation Trinity A-series APUs like the A8-5500 and A10-5700, with HD 7500/7600 series GPUs, based on Socket FM2, were expected in June 2012. Later, the branding changed to AMD SmartShift.

== Technologies ==
=== Hybrid CrossFire / Hybrid CrossFireX / Dual Graphics ===
The Hybrid CrossFireX is a technology allowing the IGP, or Integrated Graphics Processor, and the discrete GPU, or Graphics Processing Unit, to form a CrossFire setup to enhance the system capability to render 3D scenes, while the Hybrid CrossFire X technology is present on the 790GX and 890G chipsets, with two supplied physical PCI-E x16 slots at x8 bandwidth, can form a Hybrid CrossFire X setup with two video cards and the IGP, enhancing the 3D rendering capabilities.

Initial performance results paired with a Radeon HD 2400 video card leads to a 50% performance increase over standalone Radeon HD 2400 performance, notebook products will also be available. Three operation modes were spotted as follows:

ATI Hybrid Graphics
Mode	On-board IGP	Discrete PCI-E video card(s) (including AXIOM/MXM module(s))
On-board IGP only	On	Off
Discrete mode	Off	On
Hybrid Mode	On	On
Notes: Hybrid CrossFire X was formerly only available on 790GX, 780G, 760G, 785G, and 880G and 890GX chipsets, but now A6-series and A8-series AMD APUs can be used in "Dual Graphics" configurations with HD 6570 & HD 6670 video cards.

One notable issue is that when the IGP paired with a DirectX 10.1 video card, the whole hybrid CrossFire setup will support up to DirectX 10.0 only, and the UVD in IGP will be shut down. The new 785G chipset has solved this issue however and supports DirectX 10.1.

As of 2012, it seems that this "Hybrid CrossFireX" is called "Dual Graphics". AMD claims that – for an A8-3850 APU paired with an HD 6670 video card – dual graphics more than doubles performance (the benchmark increased by 123%) compared with the APU alone. But the performance of a standalone HD 6670 video card does not appear to be stated or compared. However, the Japanese computer magazine ASCII has published charts showing worthwhile improvements for the combination of A8-3850 with HD 6450, HD 6570 and HD 6670, as have Tom's Hardware and Hardware Canucks. Furthermore, on this issue, there are certain APU+GPU combinations that only work in Directx 10 or above with the APU graphics being the default rendering GPU, notably A6/A8-3000 series and HD 6490/7400.

=== SurroundView ===
SurroundView is a brand/marketing term for the capability to drive multiple monitors as available in the ATI RS480 chipset. At most four monitors with a discrete graphics card can be connected onto the supported video output ports (one through LVDS, that is either HDMI or DVI-D port and one D-Sub port), in "extended desktop mode" or "clone/mirror/duplicate mode". The integrated graphics processor and the discrete graphics processor work in parallel to drive multiple displays. Therefore, SurroundView is different from Hybrid CrossFireX.

The successor of SurroundView is AMD Eyefinity.

=== PowerXpress ===
Available on mainstream mobile IGP chipsets (AMD M780G and M690), the PowerXpress technology allows seamless switching from integrated graphics (IGP) to discrete graphics on notebooks when the notebook is connected to the AC power supply for better 3D rendering capabilities, and vice versa when disconnected from the power supply to increase battery life. The process does not require a system reboot as in the past and some current notebook implementations, and it features a UI within the driver which can profile applications to run on specified GPUs. In addition to that, later GPU models feature an Ultra Low Power Saving (ULPS) state that completely disables the discrete GPU when not in use, thus further saving power. However this feature proved to be buggy when inappropriate drivers are installed.

Current Linux support of this feature may be complete since Catalyst 11.4 (fglrx driver 8.840 or newer) according to a Phoronix article. X.org currently does not support seamless graphic cards hot-switching without restarting the X server.

PowerXpress (Mobile)
Mode	Plugged to AC power?	On-board IGP	discrete AXIOM/MXM GPU module(s)	Default PowerPlay power settings
AC Mode	Yes	Off	On	"Maximum performance"
DC Mode	No	On	Off	"Maximum battery life"

The internal AMD technology name is PowerXpress

- PowerXpress v1 – v3.0, were branded by the same name, "PowerXpress"
- PowerXpress v4.0, the external name is rebranded as "Dynamic Switchable Graphics" (DSG).
- PowerXpress v5.0 - present, DSG is rebranded as "Enduro".

== See also ==
- Nvidia Optimus
