= Intel Extreme Tuning Utility =

Utility software developed by Intel

- Developer: Intel Corporation
- Release: 2007; 19 years ago
- Stable release: 10.0.1.188 / 4 August 2026; 21 days ago
- Operating system: Windows 10, Windows 11
- Predecessor: Intel Desktop Control Center
- Available in: English
- Type: Utility software
- Website: Official website

Intel Extreme Tuning Utility (Intel XTU) is a utility software developed by Intel for Microsoft Windows that enables users to tweak their central processing unit (CPU) without the need to enter BIOS. The tool works for both desktop and mobile CPUs. Features include adjusting core voltage, clock speed multipliers, and setting power limits. It also offers a one-click overclocking feature, an integrated stress test, benchmarking tools, real-time monitoring options, and a system information display.

== History ==
Intel Extreme Tuning Utility was originally released in 2007 as a software for Intel's X38 chipset aimed at mainboard designers. In 2013, the software was updated to include a feature called "AppTune", which offers dynamic overclocking that can be set individually for each program. The program received an UI overhaul in 2020 and again in 2021. Support for DDR5 SDRAM and Windows 11 was added in 2021. Also in 2021, with the release of Intel's 12th-generation Alder Lake CPUs, a one-click overclocking feature called "Intel Speed Optimizer" was added for unlocked CPUs. In 2023, a feature exclusive to the 14th-generation Raptor Lake Refresh of Intel Core-branded CPUs called "AI Assist" was added as an extension to the automatic overclocking tool that uses artificial intelligence to optimize clock speeds. With the release of Intel's Arrow Lake CPUs in 2024, Intel XTU was divided into two versions supporting models before and after the new microarchitecture.

== Reception ==
Digital Trends described Intel Extreme Utility in 2023 as a "valuable tool for those looking to push their Intel processors to their limits while maintaining system stability", while noting that "using Intel XTU can void CPU warranties and [...] carries some risks, including potential hardware damage and stability issues".

In 2026, TechSpot included Intel XTU in a "list of essential desktop apps", calling it "especially useful for enthusiasts working with unlocked chips or high-end laptops that allow tuning".

== See also ==
- AMD OverDrive, equivalent utility from AMD (replaced by Ryzen Master in 2017)
