= Socket F+ =

CPU socket for AMD server CPUs

- Type: LGA
- Contacts: 1207
- FSB frequency: 200 MHz System clock 2.6GHz HyperTransport 3.0
- Processors: Opteron 8300, 2300 series Athlon 64 FX-70 series
- This article is part of the CPU socket series

Socket F+ (also Socket Fr2 internally) is a CPU Socket for AMD server processors starting from the 45 nm generation of the K10 CPU family. It is the successor to Socket F. The main difference between the two sockets is the supported HyperTransport version, while Socket F supports HyperTransport 2.0 at 1.0 GHz speed, Socket F+ supports HyperTransport 3.0 at up to 2.6 GHz speed and is backwards compatible with version 1.0 and 2.0.

== See also ==
- List of AMD microprocessors
