= Xpress 3200 =

Computer chipset by ATI

Xpress 3200 chipset
- Codename: Manta (RD580)
- CPU supported: Athlon 64 Series; Sempron; Pentium 4/Pentium D Core 2 (up to 1066 MHz FSB)
- Socket supported: Socket AM2; Socket 939; LGA 775

Miscellaneous
- Release date: March 1, 2006
- Predecessor: Radeon Xpress 200/ Radeon Xpress 1600
- Successor: AMD 580 chipset series

The Xpress 3200 is a revision of the Xpress 200 computer chipset released by ATI. The chipset supports AMD64 processors for Socket 939 and Socket AM2.

== History of the Xpress 3200 chipset ==
The Radeon Xpress chipset was designed by ATI to enter the realm of the desktop arena, especially the AMD Socket 939 platform where ATI's rival, Nvidia, had a clear market advantage. The Xpress 200 was launched with the Crossfire edition of the chipset considered as the high end of the chipset. However, rolling delays with the Crossfire Master Cards forced ATI to launch the Socket 939 platform while the Intel platform was scrapped due to time constraints. Reviews painted the Xpress 200 Crossfire as a board that could match Nvidia's nForce 4 SLI. With the release of the nForce 4 16x SLI, ATI changed strategy and announced the RD580 chipset.

The RD580's difference from the Xpress 200 chipset is the 40 PCI Express lanes within the Northbridge. ATI said that having 2 chipsets with 20 PCI Express lanes would slow down data transfers when the chipset is working with multi-GPU configurations. They said that having all the PCI Express lanes within the Northbridge would be more efficient and have less bottlenecking as compared to the nForce 4 16x SLI. The RD580 was called the Radeon Xpress 3200 and was released on March 1, 2006. The chipset is also configured for the new Socket AM2, and many motherboard manufacturers decided to skip the Socket 939 RD580 and begin R&D on the Socket AM2 RD580.

With the launch of the Socket AM2, ATI also announced the release of their SB600 southbridge, compatible with the RD580 northbridge. Originally, the SB450/SB460 was highly flawed in the USB design and lacking in cutting edge features as compared to Nvidia's counterpart, which resulted in low sales. The ULi 1575 Southbridge was the other preferred Southbridge until Nvidia took over ULi.

With the final acquisition of ATI, AMD renamed all ATI chipsets for the AMD platform. The Xpress 3200 Crossfire chipsets for AMD platform (Socket AM2) were renamed as the AMD 580X Crossfire chipset.

== Common features ==
- Support for up to 40 PCI Express lanes within Northbridge. 32 PCI Express lanes dedicated for two 16x PCI Express slots. 4 PCI Express lanes for interconnection with Northbridge and Southbridge (A-Link II). Other PCI Express lanes configured by the manufacturer.
- Compatible with either ATI's SB450/SB460/SB600 or ULI's M1573/M1575 Southbridge.
- Support for up to 8 USB 2.0 ports.
- Support for 4 SATA and 4 PATA drives. The SATA can be formed into RAID 0, 1 or 0+1 if used with the SB450/SB460 Southbridge. Support for 4 SATA and 4 PATA drives and the SATA can be formed into a RAID of 0, 1, 1+0, 5 or JBOD if used with the ULI M1575 Southbridge. Support for 4 SATA and 2 PATA drives if used with the SB600. RAID support in the SB600 is still a standard 0, 1 or 1+0.
- AC97 High Definition audio with either Realtek ALC882/ALC882D/ALC888/ALC883, SoundBlaster Live! 24-bit or Analog Devices AD1986A.
- Support for up to 7 PCI slots.
- Support for multi-GPU configuration known as CrossFire.

== AMD platform ==
=== Xpress 3200 for socket 939 ===
- Supports all socket 939 CPUs including the Opteron series for socket 939
- DDR support up to DDR400 and in 4 GiB capacity.
- Dongleless Crossfire for the X1300 series, X1600 series, the X1800GTO and as well as the unofficial support for X1900GT.

==== Motherboards ====
- Abit - AT8-32x
- Asus - A8R32-MVP
- DFI - UT Lanparty CFX3200
- Sapphire - PURE Crossfire A9RD580

=== Xpress 3200 for Socket AM2 ===
- Supports all Socket AM2 CPUs.
- DDR2 support up to DDR2 800 and in 8 GB capacity.
- Dongleless Crossfire for the X1300 series, X1600 series, the X1800GTO and as well as the unofficial support for X1900GT.
- Renamed as AMD 580X CrossFire chipset.

==== Motherboards ====
- Abit - AT9-32X
- Asus - M2R32-MVP
- DFI - Infinity CFX3200-M2R/G
- DFI - LanParty UT CFX3200-M2R/G
- ECS - KA3 MVP v1.0A
- EPoX - Optimus EP-AD580 XR
- MSI - K9A Platinum
- PC Partner - RD580AKM-AA1D
- Sapphire - PC-AM2RD580
- Sapphire - PC-AM2RD580Adv

== Intel platform ==
The Xpress 3200 chipset for Intel platform is under the "RD600" codename, supporting Intel LGA 775 CPUs, such as Core 2 Duo, and the support for multi-GPU configuration, as CrossFire, to run two or more PCI-E graphics cards in two physical PCI-E x16 slots.

=== Availability ===
The RD600 has undergone delays over the months, it was originally expected to be released in Q2'06. As ATI was officially merged with AMD on the October 25, 2006, it is being more unclear that ATI will offer more chipsets supporting Intel CPUs. Since RD600 was delayed, it was reported that some of the motherboard manufacturer have dropped plans to produce motherboards using RD600 chipset. However, the first motherboard using the chipset will be produced by DFI and the first retail product was scheduled for release December 2006, named as "DFI LanParty UT ICFX3200 - TR2/G". There are now actual products of "DFI LanParty UT ICFX3200 - TR2/G" on sale in some places such as Hong Kong and Singapore.

As the NDA rapidly approached, some popular overclocking sites such as XtremeSystems and VR-Zone started posting teasers for the soon to be released "DFI LanParty UT ICFX3200 - TR2/G". However, a big surprise was the revelation that the RD600 was based on a version of the RD480 or the Xpress 1600 chipset. One popular reason for this was that the RD480 was also designed for an Intel platform but constant delays and revision issues caused the Intel RD480 to become the RD600.

Recent report says Asus has finished a chipset design for RD600.

==== Official features ====
- 2 or 3 physical PCI Express slots
- 20 PCI-Express lanes configured with 2 PCI-E lanes dedicated for Northbridge and Southbridge connection, 16x PCI-E lane for dedicated graphics (2 8x PCI-E lanes when in Crossfire mode) and a 2x lane for Crossfire physics. The revised Northbridge - Southbridge link from the RD580 is used and a revised PCI-E controller built into the Northbridge.
- Support for up to 6 SATA hard disks

== Trivia ==
- The RD580 was codenamed "Manta" because of the use of aquarium fishes for codenames within ATI.
- Engineering samples were completed just after the launch of Nvidia's nForce 4 16x SLI.
- The RD580 was supposedly launched on the same day the Radeon X1900 but it was delayed to coincide with the launch of the socket AM2. However, with the slippage in the Socket AM2 to June 6, 2006, ATI decided to launch on March 1, 2006.
- The package of the RD580 is no bigger than a US 50-cent coin and has a thermal dissipation rating of 7 watts.
- The world record for highest 3DMark2005 score using Crossfire was achieved on this chipset during the launch.
- Asus was rumoured selling the chipset before the launch of the Xpress 3200 in Seville. It was confirmed by various overclocking websites all round the world.
- The Xpress 3200 is pin-compatible with the Xpress 200 boards, making R&D much more cost-effective.
- ATI released the Xpress 3200 for AM2 after Nvidia's launch of the nForce 500 series.
- AMD has renamed the chipsets for AMD platform as the AMD 580X Crossfire after the takeover of ATI.

== See also ==
- ATI Technologies
- Comparison of ATI Chipsets
