= AMD 580 chipset series =

Computer chipset series by AMD

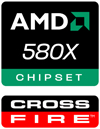
- Codename: Manta (580X)
- CPU supported: Athlon 64 FX; Athlon 64 X2; Athlon 64; Sempron
- Socket supported: Socket 939 / AM2

Desktop / mobile chipsets
- Performance segment: 580X
- Mainstream segment: 570X
- Value segment: 480X

Miscellaneous
- Release date: February 2007
- Predecessor: Radeon Xpress 1600; Radeon Xpress 3200
- Successor: AMD 690 chipset series

AMD 580 chipset series is a computer chipset series designed by the AMD Graphics Product Group, for the AMD processors. It was designed for usage with ATI's CrossFire Multi GPU Technology, with both PCI Express slots running at x16 lanes each.

== History ==
The 580X chipset was originally named the "ATI Radeon Xpress 3200 chipset". The Radeon Xpress chipset was designed by ATI to enter the realm of the desktop arena, especially the AMD Socket 939 platform where ATI's rival, nVidia, had a clear market advantage. The Xpress 200 was launched with the CrossFire edition of the chipset considered as the high end of the chipset. However, rolling delays with the Crossfire Master Cards forced ATI to launch the Socket 939 platform while the Intel platform was scrapped due to time constraints. Reviews painted the Xpress 200 Crossfire as a board that could match nVidia's nForce 4 SLI. With the release of the nForce 4 16x SLI, ATI changed strategy and announced the RD580 chipset.

The RD580 was the same as the Xpress 200 chipset with the exception of the 40 PCI Express lanes within the northbridge. It was claimed by ATI that having 2 chipsets with 20 PCI Express lanes would slow down data transfers when the chipset is working in multi-GPU configurations. Having all of the PCI Express lanes within the Northbridge claimed to be more efficient and less bottlenecking as compared to the nForce 4 16x SLI. The RD580 was called the "Radeon Xpress 3200" and was released on March 1, 2006. Supposedly, the chipset is also configured for the new Socket AM2 and of such, many motherboard manufacturers have decided to skip the Socket 939 RD580 and began research and development (R&D) on the Socket AM2 version of RD580.

With the launch of the socket AM2, ATI also announced the release of their SB600 southbridge which was to be compatible with the RD580 northbridge. Originally, the SB450/SB460 was highly flawed in the USB design and lacking in cutting edge features as compared to nVidia's counterpart which resulted in low sales. The ULi 1575 Southbridge was the other preferred Southbridge until nVidia took over ULI. As a result, high expectations was placed on ATI to design a Southbridge that was on-par or greater than the ULI 1575. As reference boards for Socket AM2 trickled out, many sites commented that ATI had an even footing against nVidia with great improvement in the SB600 southbridge.

As of the completion of the acquisition of ATI, AMD has currently moved to rename all ATI chipsets for the AMD platform. The Xpress 3200 CrossFire chipsets for Socket AM2 processors have been renamed as the "AMD 580X Crossfire" chipset, for the socket 939 variant, since AMD has stopped producing socket 939 CPUs, the "Xpress 3200 CrossFire" chipset for socket 939 CPUs, has not been renamed.

== Naming of AMD chipsets ==
To the consumer nowadays, the RD580 is known as the "CrossFire Xpress 3200".

Since ATI was merged as a subsidiary of AMD in October 2006, the naming scheme of AMD chipset platforms have been changed, and is summarized below:

According to the rule of denomination of AMD chipset, all AMD chipsets are denominated as AMD + chipset's code + code of product segment, in which the product segment includes X(Multi GPU), T(Premium Class IGP), G(Mainstream Class IGP) and V(Value Class IGP). Under the rule, therefore, the previously denominated ATI Xpress 3200, codename RD580, now is denominated to AMD 580X CrossFire. For mobile platform, the denomination is a little bit different; this is followed by AMD + M + chipset's code. For example, RX690M is denominated as AMD M690. In addition, if the chipset has IGP, the brand of ATI is kept in the graphic part. For example, the next-generation AMD IGP RS690 [chipset] has got the name "AMD 690G Chipset with ATI Radeon X1250 Graphics".

— HKEPC, report on change of naming scheme

Therefore, under the naming scheme, the chipsets will be renamed as follows:

Original codename	Segment	Name under old scheme	Prefix	Suffix	Current name
RD580	Enthusiast Multi-GPU	CrossFire Xpress 3200	-	X	AMD 580X CrossFire Chipset
RD550/RD570?	Mainstream Multi-GPU	CrossFire Xpress 3100	-	X	AMD 570X CrossFire Chipset (formerly AMD 550X CrossFire chipset)
RD480	Value Multi-GPU	CrossFire Xpress 1600	-	X	AMD 480X CrossFire Chipset

For instance, chipsets which support multi-GPUs will add an "X" as suffix, thus making "RD580" become "AMD 580X CrossFire chipset".

== Common features ==
- The northbridge supports up to 40 PCI Express lanes. 32 PCI Express lanes are dedicated for two 16x PCI Express slots. 4 PCI Express lanes are used for interconnection between the northbridge and southbridge (A-Link II). The configuration of the other PCI Express lanes is up to the motherboard manufacturer to decide.
- Compatible with either ATI's SB450/SB460/SB600 or ULI's M1573/M1575 southbridge (unavailable as a result of NVIDIA's acquisition of ULI in 2006).
- Support for up to 8 USB 2.0 ports.
- Support for 4 SATA and 4 PATA drives. The SATA can be formed a RAID 0, 1 or 0+1 if used with the SB450/SB460 southbridge. Support for 4 SATA2/SATA and 4 PATA drives and the SATA can be formed into a RAID of 0, 1, 1+0, 5 or JBOD (also known as Just a Bunch of Disks) if used with the ULI M1575 southbridge. Support for 4 SATA and 2 PATA drives if used with the SB600 with RAID support standard 0, 1 or 1+0 levels.
- AC97 high-definition audio with either Realtek ALC882/ALC882D/ALC888/ALC883, SoundBlaster Live! 24-bit or Analog Devices AD1986A.
- Support for up to 7 PCI slots.
- Support for multi-GPU configuration known as CrossFire.

== Lineup ==
Note: The following list of sub-sections are named following the new naming scheme by AMD.

=== 580X ===
- Originally RD580, reference board codenamed "Manta" because of the use of aquarium fishes for codenames within ATI.
- Supports all socket AM2 CPUs.
- Supports up to 8 GB of DDR2-800 memory
- Dongleless Crossfire support at 16x-16x PCI Express lanes which is the only chipset provided with two 16x PCI-E CrossFire mode aimed at enthusiast market.
- The package of the RD580 is no bigger than a US 50-cent piece and has a thermal dissipation rating of 7 watts.
- Can be paired with ULi southbridges, ATI SB400 series and SB600 southbridges for various numbers of USB and SATA 3.0 Gbit/s peripherals.

=== 570X (presumably the former 550X) ===
The report also reveals that a chipset codenamed "RD550", named as "AMD 550X CrossFire chipset", provides 2 PCI-E lanes for Dual card CrossFire configurations, and is focused in the mainstream market. 550X will be released in the first half of 2007. However, as of the middle of May 2007, there was no sign of release of the 550X chipset.

=== 480X ===
- Support for up to 20 PCI Express lanes.
- Can be paired with ULi southbridges, ATI SB400 series and SB600 southbridges for various numbers of USB and SATA 3.0 Gbit/s peripherals.
- Support for up to 7 PCI slots.
- Support for ATI CrossFire multi-GPU technology.
- Motherboards utilising this chipset will feature two 16x PCI-Express slots which only operate at x8 lanes when CrossFire is enabled.

=== SB600 (Southbridge) ===
The southbridge paired with some of the 580X and 480X chipsets, all of the 570X chipsets, all AMD 690 chipsets, and early AMD 790 chipsets, is the SB600 or IXP600. It is based on a 130 nm fabrication process with dimensions 23 mm×23 mm and 549 pins FC BGA package, and provides 10 USB, 1 ATA/133, and 4 SATA 3.0 Gbit/s interfaces. It supports RAID 0, 1, 0+1, and 10 across all four SATA ports (all four ports are required for RAID 10 functionality, Alert Standards Format (ASF) 2.0 and high-definition audio codec support. Also, the chipset says it supports 64-bit DMA but it really only supports 32-bit.
The SB660 is notably used in the AmigaOne X1000, which has a PowerPC CPU instead of a x86 CPU for which the SB660 was not designed for.

== See also ==
- Advanced Micro Devices
- ATI Technologies
- AMD 690 chipset series
- Comparison of AMD Chipsets
