= List of ATI chipsets =

This is a comparison of chipsets, manufactured by ATI Technologies.

== For AMD processors ==
=== Comparison of northbridges ===
Codename	Model	Release date	Processors supported	Fabrication process(nm)	FSB/HT Frequency (MHz)	CrossFire Enabled	Features	Southbridge	NB-SB Interface	Notes
ATI A3	IGP 320	2002	Athlon, Duron	180	266/200 (FSB)	No	Radeon VE IGP (Radeon 7000)160 MHz, AGP 4x	ATI IXP200/IXP250, VIA VT82C686B, ALI M1535D+	A-Link/PCI	HydraVision, Video Immersion, TV-out
ATI U1	IGP 320M	2002	Athlon 4 Mobile, Athlon XP-M, Mobile Duron	180	266/200 (FSB)	No	Radeon VE IGP (Radeon 7000)160 MHz, AGP 4x	ATI IXP200/IXP250, VIA VT82C686B, ALI M1535D+	A-Link/PCI	ATI PowerPlay, HydraVision, Video Immersion, TV-out
RS380	ATI Radeon 380 IGP		Athlon 64, Sempron (Socket 754)	150	800? BI-DIRECTIONAL	No	Radeon 9000 IGP, AGP 8x	SB300C, SB380, SB210 (IXP200/250)		
RX380			Athlon 64, Sempron (Socket 754)	150	800? BI-DIRECTIONAL	No	AGP 8x	SB300C, SB380, SB210 (IXP200/250)		
RS380M	ATI Radeon 380M IGP		Mobile Athlon 64, Mobile Sempron, Turion 64	150	800 BI-DIRECTIONAL	No	Radeon 9000 IGP, AGP 8x			Mobile chipset PowerPlay 4.0 support
RS480	ATI Radeon Xpress 200	November 8, 2004	Athlon 64, Athlon 64 FX, Athlon 64 X2, Sempron	130	1000 BI-DIRECTIONAL	No	Radeon X300 graphics core 300 MHz	SB400, SB450, SB460, ULi M1573	A-Link Express (Note: A-Link Express and A-Link Express II is essentially PCI-Express x4 lanes, so that any PCI Express capable southbridge can be used (such as ULI M1573/M1575).)	
RX480	ATI Radeon Xpress 200P	November 8, 2004	Athlon 64, Athlon 64 FX, Athlon 64 X2, Sempron	130	1000 BI-DIRECTIONAL	No		SB400, SB450, SB460, ULi M1573	A-Link Express	
RS480M	ATI Radeon Xpress 200M (1100/1150)	November 8, 2004	Mobile Athlon 64, Mobile Sempron, Turion 64, Athlon 64	130	800 BI-DIRECTIONAL	No	Radeon X300 IGP (Xpress 1100, 300 MHz/ Xpress 1150, 400 MHz)			Mobile chipset PowerPlay 5.0 support
RS482	ATI Radeon Xpress 1100 (ATI Radeon Xpress 200)	2005	Athlon 64, Athlon 64 FX, Athlon 64 X2, Sempron	110	1000 BI-DIRECTIONAL	No	Radeon X300 IGP, 300 MHz	SB450, SB460, ULi M1575	A-Link Express II	No sideport memory
RS485	ATI Radeon Xpress 1150 (ATI Radeon Xpress 200)	May 23, 2006	Athlon 64, Athlon 64 FX, Athlon 64 X2, Sempron	110	1000 BI-DIRECTIONAL	No	Radeon X300 IGP, 400 MHz	SB450, SB460, SB600, ULi M1575	A-Link Express II	
RD480	ATI CrossFire Xpress 1600 (ATI Radeon Xpress 200 CrossFire Edition)	September 27, 2005	Athlon 64, Athlon 64 FX, Athlon 64 X2, Sempron	110	1000 BI-DIRECTIONAL	Yes, x8		SB600, ULi M1575	A-Link Express II	
RD580	ATI Radeon Xpress 3200	March 1, 2006	Athlon 64, Athlon 64 FX, Athlon 64 X2, Sempron	110	1000 BI-DIRECTIONAL	Yes, x16		SB600	A-Link Express II	

=== Comparison of southbridges ===
Codename	Model	Year	Fabrication process (nm)	SATA Ports	USB Ports	Audio	IDE Channels (2 Devices/Channel)	Notes
IXP200	Radeon 320(M)/330/34x(M)/350M/360 IGP	2002		0	6 USB2	AC'97	2 ATA100	A-Link, 3Com 10/100 Ethernet
IXP250	Radeon 320(M)/330/34x(M)/350M/360 IGP	2002		0	6 USB2	AC'97	2 ATA100	A-Link, 3Com 10/100 Ethernet, DMI, MBA, ASF, WOL
SB300C		2003		1 (SATA 150 Mbit/s)	6	AC'97	2 (ATA133)	10/100 Ethernet, APM
IXP380/SB380		2003		1 (SATA 150 Mbit/s)	6 (USB 2.0)	AC'97	2 (ATA 133)	10/100 Ethernet, APM, 8-bit HyperTransport links
IXP400/SB400	Radeon Xpress 200; Radeon Xpress 1150	2004		4	8	HD	2	
IXP450/SB450	Radeon Xpress 200; Radeon Xpress 1150	2004		4	8	HD	2 (UDMA 100/133)	RAID 0 and 1
IXP460/SB460	Radeon Xpress 1600; Radeon Xpress 1150	2004		4	8	HD	1	
SB600	AMD 480/570/580; CrossFire Chipset	2006	130	4	10	HD	1 (ATA 133)	RAID 0, 1, 10 eSATA, ASF 2.0

== For Intel processors ==
=== Comparison of northbridges ===
Codename	Model	Year	Processors Supported	Fabrication process (nm)	FSB/QDR Frequency (MHz)	Crossfire Enabled	Features	Southbridge	NB-SB Interface	Notes
RS200L	IGP 330	2002	Pentium 4 (Northwood, Prescott)	180	400	No	Radeon VE (7000) IGP 150 MHz, AGP 4x, up to 1GiB of DDR-200 or 266	ATI IXP200/IXP250, VIA VT82C686B, ALI M1535D+	A-Link/PCI	HydraVision, Video Immersion, TV-out
RS200	IGP 340	2002	Pentium 4 (Northwood, Prescott)	180	533/400	No	Radeon VE (7000) IGP 183 MHz, AGP 4x, up to 1GiB of DDR-200 or 266	ATI IXP200/IXP250, VIA VT82C686B, ALI M1535D+	A-Link/PCI	HydraVision, Video Immersion, TV-out
RS200M revA	IGP 340M	2002	Pentium 4-M	180	533/400	No	Radeon VE (7000) IGP 183 MHz, AGP 4x, up to 1GiB of DDR-200 or 266	ATI IXP200/IXP250, VIA VT82C686B, ALI M1535D+	A-Link/PCI	ATI PowerPlay, HydraVision, Video Immersion, TV-out
RS200M+	IGP 345M	2002	Pentium 4-M	180	533/400	No	Radeon VE (7000) IGP 183 MHz, AGP 4x, up to 1GiB of DDR-200 or 266	ATI IXP200/IXP250, VIA VT82C686B, ALI M1535D+	A-Link/PCI	ATI PowerPlay, HydraVision, Video Immersion, TV-out
RS200M revB	IGP 350M	2003	Pentium M	180	533/400	No	Radeon VE (7000) IGP 183 MHz, AGP 4x, up to 1GiB of DDR-200 or 266	ATI IXP200/IXP250, VIA VT82C686B, ALI M1535D+	A-Link/PCI	
RS250M	IGP 7000 (IGP 360)	2003	Pentium 4-M HT, Pentium 4, Pentium M	180	533/400	No	Radeon VE (7000) IGP 183 MHz, AGP 4x, up to 4GiB of DDR-200, 266 or 333	ATI IXP200/IXP250, VIA VT82C686B, ALI M1535D+	A-Link/PCI	ATI PowerPlay 2.0, HydraVision, Video Immersion, TV-out
RS350	ATI Radeon 9100 PRO IGP	2004			800	No, AGP 8x	Radeon 9100 IGP	IXP150, IXP200, IXP300		Dual Channel Memory
RC350	ATI Radeon 9000 PRO IGP	2004			800	No, AGP 8x	Radeon 9000 IGP	IXP150, IXP200, IXP300		Single Channel Memory
RX330					800	No, AGP 8x	As RS350 without IGP	IXP150, IXP200, IXP300		
RX320M										Mobile chipset, PowerPlay
RS400 RS415 RC400 RC410	ATI Radeon Xpress 1150 (originally named ATI Radeon Xpress 200 for Intel); Intel Essential Series D101GCC/D102GCC (Grand Country)	Mar 11 2005	Pentium 4, Core 2		1066	No	Radeon X300 IGP			
RS600	ATI Radeon Xpress 1250	Aug 29 2006	Pentium 4, Core 2	80	1066	No	Radeon X700 IGP, 500 MHz			AVIVO, HDMI with HDCP, Dual Channel Memory
RD600	ATI Radeon CrossFire Xpress 3200	Sep 27 2006	Pentium 4, Core 2		1066	Yes, Dual x8				Dual Channel Memory
Codename	Model	Year	Processors Supported	Fabrication process (nm)	FSB/QDR Frequency (MHz)	Crossfire Enabled	Features	Southbridge	NB-SB Interface	Notes

=== Comparison of southbridges ===
Codename	Model	Year	Fabrication process (nm)	SATA Ports	USB Ports	Audio	IDE Channels (2 Devices/Channel)	Notes
IXP150	Radeon 9100 IGP			0	6	AC'97	2 (UDMA33/66)	3Com 10/100 Ethernet
IXP210				1 (SATA 150 Mbit/s)	6	AC'97	1 (UDMA 33/66/100/133)	3Com 10/100 Ethernet, APM, ALink/ALink II
IXP250	Radeon 330 IGP			0	6	AC'97	1 (UDMA 100)	3Com 10/100 Ethernet, DMI, MBA, and ASF
IXP300/SB300	Radeon 340 IGP			2 (SATA 150 Mbit/s)	6	AC'97	1 (UDMA 33/66/100/133)	3Com 10/100 Ethernet, APM, ALink/ALink II
IXP320/SB320				2 (SATA 150 Mbit/s)	8	AC'97	1 (UDMA 33/66/100/133)	3Com 10/100 Ethernet, RAID 0 and 1, APM, ALink/ALink II
IXP400/SB400	Radeon Xpress 200; Radeon Xpress 1150	2004		4 (SATA 150 Mbit/s)	8	AC'97	2 (UDMA 100/133)	
IXP450/SB450	Radeon Xpress 200; Radeon Xpress 1150	2004		4	8	HD	2	
IXP460/SB460	Radeon Xpress 1600; Radeon Xpress 1150	2004		4	8	HD	1	
SB600	AMD 480/570/580; CrossFire Chipset	2006	130	4	10	HD	1 (ATA 133)	RAID 0, 1, 10 eSATA, ASF 2.0

== See also ==
- List of Intel chipsets
- Comparison of AMD chipsets
- Comparison of Nvidia chipsets
- List of VIA chipsets
- Comparison of AMD graphics processing units
- Comparison of Nvidia graphics processing units
