= Xpress 200 =

Computer chipset by ATI

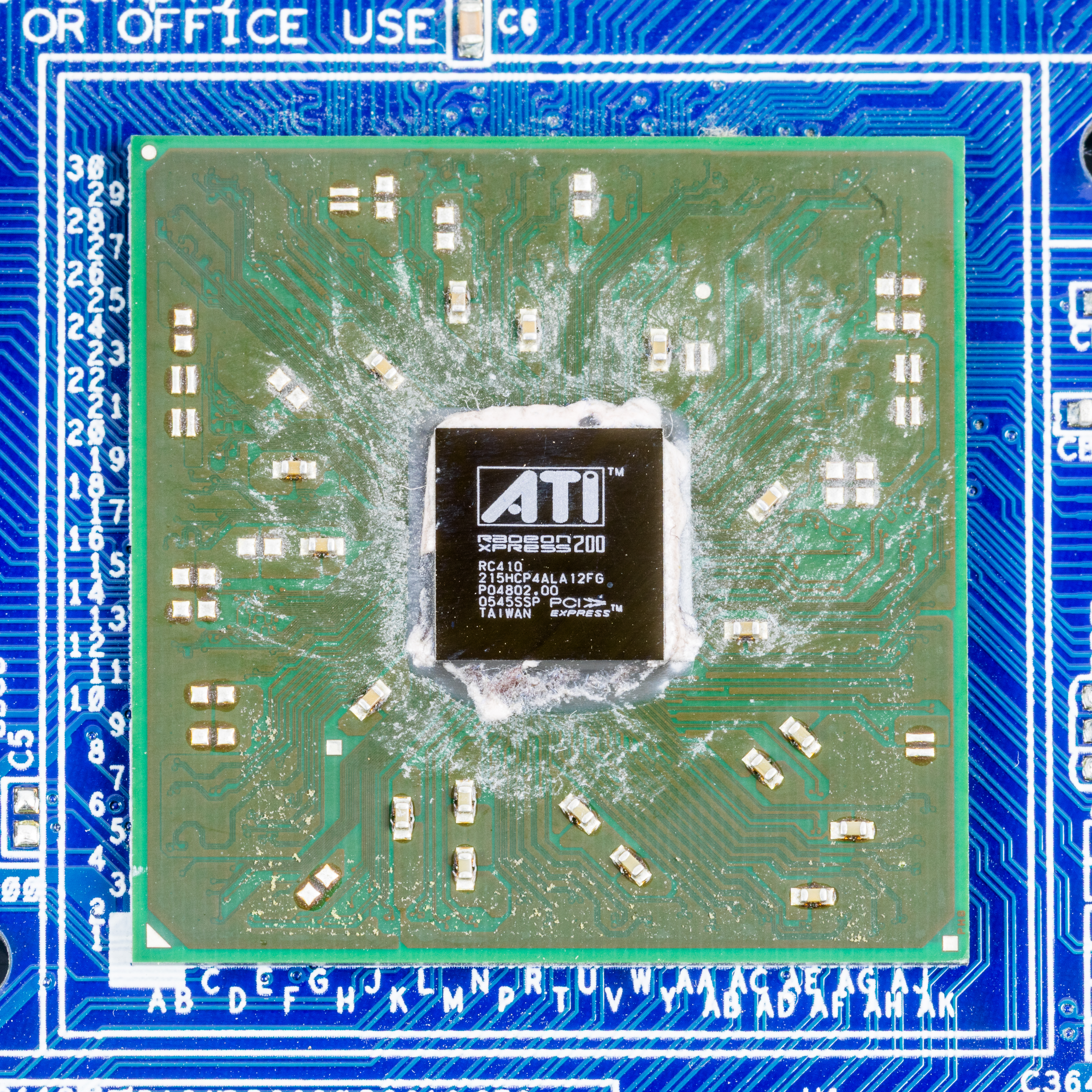
- ATI Radeon Xpress 200
- Codename(s): Bullhead, Grouper (AMD); Halibut (CrossFire for AMD); Jaguar (Intel); Stingray (CrossFire for Intel)
- CPU supported: Athlon 64 Series; Sempron; Pentium 4/Pentium D Core 2 (up to 1066 MHz FSB)
- Socket supported: Socket 939; Socket 754; LGA 775

Desktop / mobile chipsets
- Enthusiast segment: Radeon Xpress 200P; Radeon Xpress 200 CrossFire Edition
- Mainstream segment: Radeon Xpress 450

Miscellaneous
- Release date(s): November 8, 2004
- Predecessor: 9000/9100 IGP
- Successor: Radeon Xpress 3200

ATI Radeon Xpress 200 Chipset SB400 die shot

The Radeon Xpress 200 is a computer chipset released by ATI. The chipset supports AMD 64-bit processors (Socket 939 and Socket 754) as well as supporting Intel Pentium 4, Pentium D and Celeron processors (LGA 775 and Socket 478). Additionally, it includes support for DDR400 RAM and DDR-2 667 RAM on the Intel Edition.

ATI renamed its Radeon Xpress 200 Crossfire Edition chipset to CrossFire Xpress 1600. After the takeover from AMD, AMD renamed the Crossfire Xpress 1600 chipset for AMD socket AM2 platform to the AMD 480X CrossFire chipset.

== Types ==
The Radeon Xpress 200 comes in five different versions:

- Radeon Xpress 200
- Radeon Xpress 200P
- Radeon Xpress 200M
- Radeon Xpress 200 Crossfire Edition
- Radeon Xpress 200 for Intel

=== Common features ===
- Support for up to 22 PCI Express lanes.
- Support for up to 8 USB 2.0 ports.
- Support for 4 SATA and 4 PATA drives, which can be linked together in any combination of SATA and PATA to form a RAID 0, 1, or 0+1.
- AC'97 Audio for SB400.
- HD Audio for SB450, SB460 and SB600.
- Support for up to 7 PCI slots.

=== Radeon Xpress 200 ===
- DDR-RAM support
- The integrated graphics are based on the ATI Radeon X300 GPU with full OpenGL 2.0 and DirectX 9.0 support
- Later renamed as Radeon Xpress 1150 for AMD notebooks

=== Radeon Xpress 200M ===
- Radeon Xpress 200 chipset optimized for Mobile applications
- Includes AMD Turion 64 support
- Support for Shared Memory Architecture
- ATI PowerPlay 5.0 support
- Later renamed as Radeon Xpress 1150 for AMD notebooks

=== Radeon Xpress 200 Crossfire ===
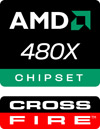
AMD 480X Crossfire logo

- This adds support for ATI's multi-GPU technology called Crossfire. It is designed to compete with nVidia's SLI technology.
- Motherboards utilizing this chipset will feature two 16x PCI-Express slots (although, like early SLI chipsets, they only operate at 8x when CrossFire is enabled, unlike some newer CrossFire and SLI capable chipsets where both slots retain full speed).
- Renamed as AMD 480X CrossFire chipset after the acquisition of AMD and ATI, with Intel CrossFire chipset retained the use of Radeon Xpress 200 CrossFire chipset.

=== Radeon Xpress 200 for Intel ===
- DDR SDRAM and DDR2 SDRAM support
- 7.1 surround sound support
- Later renamed as Radeon Xpress 1150 for Intel notebooks/desktops with a 100 MHz increase in core clock speed (400 MHz from originally 350 MHz for 200M chipset, from originally 300 MHz for Xpress 1100 chipset).

== Southbridges ==
=== SB400 (IXP 400), M1573 (RS480) ===
The Radeon Xpress 200 (RS480) chipset can make use of different southbridges, one of them is the SB400 (IXP 400), providing 2 ATA channels (2 devices per channel), 2 SATA 1.5 Gbit/s interface (4 drives total) with RAID 0, RAID 1 and RAID 0+1 support, 7 PCI slots, 8 USB 2.0 and AC'97 codec for 5.1 and 7.1 surround sound support. Motherboard manufacturers were able to replace the SB400 southbridge with the M1573 southbridge from ULi for more versatile configuration, as well as avoiding the frequently criticized USB performance issues with ATI southbridges.

=== SB450, SB460, M1575 (RS482) ===
The Radeon Xpress 200M (RS482) chipset is an upgrade to the RS480 chipset which still uses the branding, with the distinction of abandoning sideport memory support (as frame buffer) for Z-buffer data compression support. Southbridges can be chosen between ATI SB450, SB460 and ULi M1575. For the SB450, it supports 2 ATA channels (2 devices per channel), 2 SATA 1.5 Gbit/s interface (4 drives total) with RAID 0, RAID 1 and RAID 0+1 support, 7 PCI slots, together with 8 USB support, HD Audio codec support. Note that SB450 have not implemented any network and Gigabit Ethernet PHY. With SB460 supports only maximum 2 ATA devices.

== Notes ==
- Early reference boards based on the AMD versions of the chipset were codenamed 'Bullhead' and later 'Grouper'. The AMD Crossfire reference board was codenamed 'Halibut'.
- Reference boards for the Intel version are codenamed 'Jaguar', with the Intel Crossfire edition codenamed 'Stingray'.
- The Radeon Xpress 200 is designed to compete with the nVidia nForce 4 chipset. Key differences include a lack of SATA2 support in any current version of the Radeon Xpress 200, and no integrated Gigabit Ethernet compared with the nForce 4.
- The chipset series is the last to ever support Intel CPU sockets as part of the AMD acquisition of ATI.

== See also ==
- ATI Technologies
- Comparison of ATI Chipsets
