= Video Immersion =

Computer graphics processing technology

Video Immersion is a set of computer graphics processing technologies, used by ATI Technologies in their Radeon video cards. It is the brand name ATI uses to refer to the video compression acceleration feature in their R100, R200, and R300 video cards. Video Immersion is present in R100 based cards, and ATI introduced Video Immersion II with the R200.

Video Immersion II improved the de-interlacing, temporal filtering, component video, and resolution.

Video Immersion has been superseded by Unified Video Decoder (UVD) and Video Coding Engine (VCE).

== Features ==
- iDCT
- Adaptive De-Interlacing
- Motion Compensation
- Video Scaling
- Alpha Blending
- Colorspace Conversion
- Run-Level Decode & De-ZigZag

== See also ==
- Unified Video Decoder (UVD)
- Video Coding Engine (VCE)
