= Universal Abit =

Taiwanese computer components manufacturer

Universal ABIT Co., Ltd
- Company type: Subsidiary of Universal Scientific Industrial
- Industry: Computer hardware Electronics
- Founded: 1989; 37 years ago
- Defunct: 2008; 18 years ago
- Headquarters: Neihu, Taiwan
- Key people: Thore Welling (Marketing Director)
- Products: Digital Photo Frames; Motherboards; Graphics Cards; Routers; Server Hardware; Small Form Factor; Wi-Fi
- Website: abit.com.tw at the Wayback Machine (archived 2005-02-09)

Universal ABIT Co., Ltd (formerly ABIT Computer Corporation) was a computer components manufacturer, based in Taiwan, active since the 1980s. Its core product line were motherboards aimed at the overclocker market.

ABIT experienced serious financial problems in 2005. The brand name "ABIT" and other intangible properties, including patents and trademarks, were acquired by Universal Scientific Industrial Co., Ltd. (USI) in May 2006. The brand name was discontinued on 31 March 2009.

Classic ABIT Logo

== History ==
=== Early history ===
ABIT was founded in 1989. In 1991, the company had become the fastest growing motherboard manufacturer, claiming US$10 million in sales. In 2000, ABIT underwent an initial public offering (IPO) on the TAIEX stock exchange. To keep pace with their "good" sales figures, they opened a factory in Suzhou, China, and moved to new headquarters in Neihu, Taipei. The number of motherboards sold was claimed to have doubled between 2000 and 2001.

Abit chose to outsource two low-end boards for trial production from June 2002 to Elitegroup Computer Systems. Confirmation of the outsourcing move was made public in July 2002, accounting for 10% of Abit's motherboard shipments for the first model, and by August 2002, this would increase to 15-20% for the second model, for the company's niche products, such as servers and routers, Abit's factory in Taoyuan, Taiwan factory will then serve as their base.

Abit had somewhat of a blow in March 2003, when Oskar Wu, a leading engineer on the famous ABIT NF7-S motherboard, resigned after the NForce series to become head of the LANParty range at competitor DFI.

=== Investigation and financial problems ===
On 15 December 2004, the Taiwan Stock Exchange downgraded ABIT's stock due to questionable accounting practices. Investigations revealed that the majority of their import/export business was conducted through seven companies, all located at the same address and each of which had a capital of only HK$2. This made it easy to inflate the reported number of motherboards sold. The Hong Kong media also reported that the management was being investigated for embezzling funds from the company.

In June 2005, ABIT partnered with Wan Hai Industries. This container shipping company, also a principal investor in China Airlines, brought the company much needed capital, since the company had financial problems at this time, partly due to a class action lawsuit involving faulty capacitors on their products, but also because of marketing highly technical products to the general public while offering longer-than-average warranties and generous return policies.

=== Acquisition by USI and demise ===
On 25 January 2006, ABIT announced that USI intended to purchase ABIT Computer's motherboard business and brand and announced a special shareholders' meeting to discuss the sale of ABIT's Neihu building, changing ABIT's company name, the disposition of the company's assets, and the release of the directors from non-competition restrictions. ABIT sold its own office building in Taipei to Deutsche Bank in order to raise money to cut its debt.

Following USI's acquisition of the motherboard business, the remaining divisions of ABIT switched to distributing components and networking products, while using its Suzhou, China plant only to offer some motherboard contract manufacturing services.

The acquired motherboard business and the 'ABIT' brand name were used by USI under the new brand name Universal Abit. In the US, it was known as Universal Abit USA Corporation. The old company, ABIT Computer Corporation (USA), is now dissolved and is no longer in existence.

Universal Abit later announced that it would close on 31 December 2008, and officially cease to exist on 1 January 2009. By 2009, Abit no longer sold motherboards.

Universal Abit was located in Neihu, Taiwan with regional offices in China, USA, Iran and the Netherlands.

== Technical achievements ==
ABIT had a reputation among PC enthusiasts for producing motherboards that support overclocking. In the late 1990s, the company introduced their Softmenu feature, one of the first jumperless CPU configuration systems that enable overclocking to be adjusted from the BIOS instead of fiddling with jumpers. Softmenu was later extended with the development of the μGuru chip. μGuru is a custom microprocessor on Abit motherboards which, in conjunction with ABIT software, gives the ability to modify overclocking settings in real-time while the OS is running. By providing instant feedback on the results of a particular overclock setting, μGuru reduced the time required to discover optimal settings. μGuru provided a special connector for a panel in a 5¼" drive bay to display CPU speed and voltage settings. They were also one of the first motherboard manufacturers to enable undervolting.

ABIT was the first motherboard manufacturer to introduce 133 MHz FSB operation for the Intel BX chipset with the aptly named AB-BX133. ABIT also achieved symmetric multiprocessing (SMP) operation for Intel's Mendocino Celeron CPU, in their BP6 motherboard. This was an achievement because Intel had blocked SMP operation in the Celeron.

In 2004, they introduced the OTES cooling system. This heat pipe based cooling system is intended to transfer heat from the chipset or the motherboard's voltage regulators and expel it out of the system through the rear I/O panel.

During Computex 2008, Universal Abit unveiled the FunFab P80 Digital Photo Frame and Printer. It integrated a photo printer directly to a mobile phone.

== Products ==
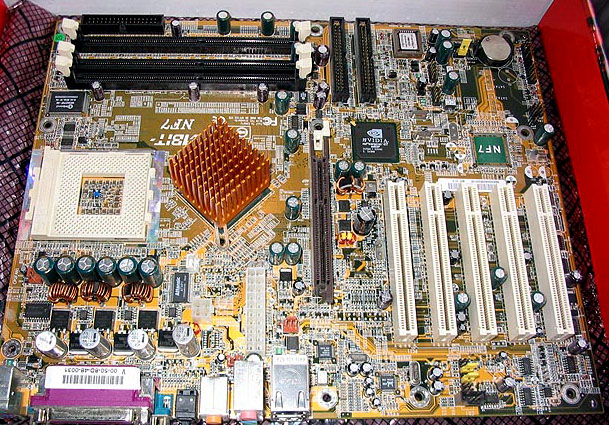
Abit NF7 Rev. 1.0 nForce2 chipset

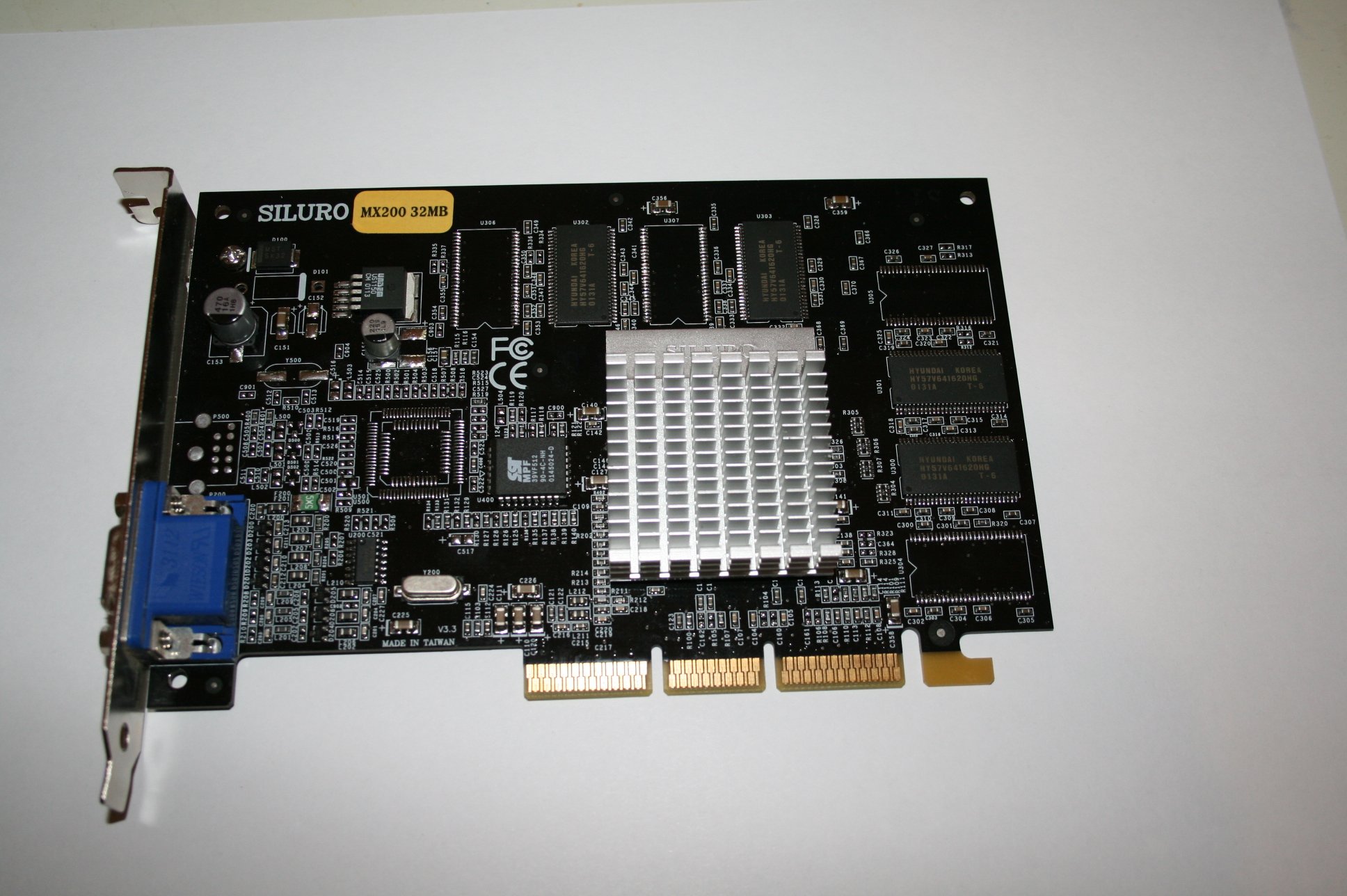
Abit Siluro GeForce2 MX200 Graphic card

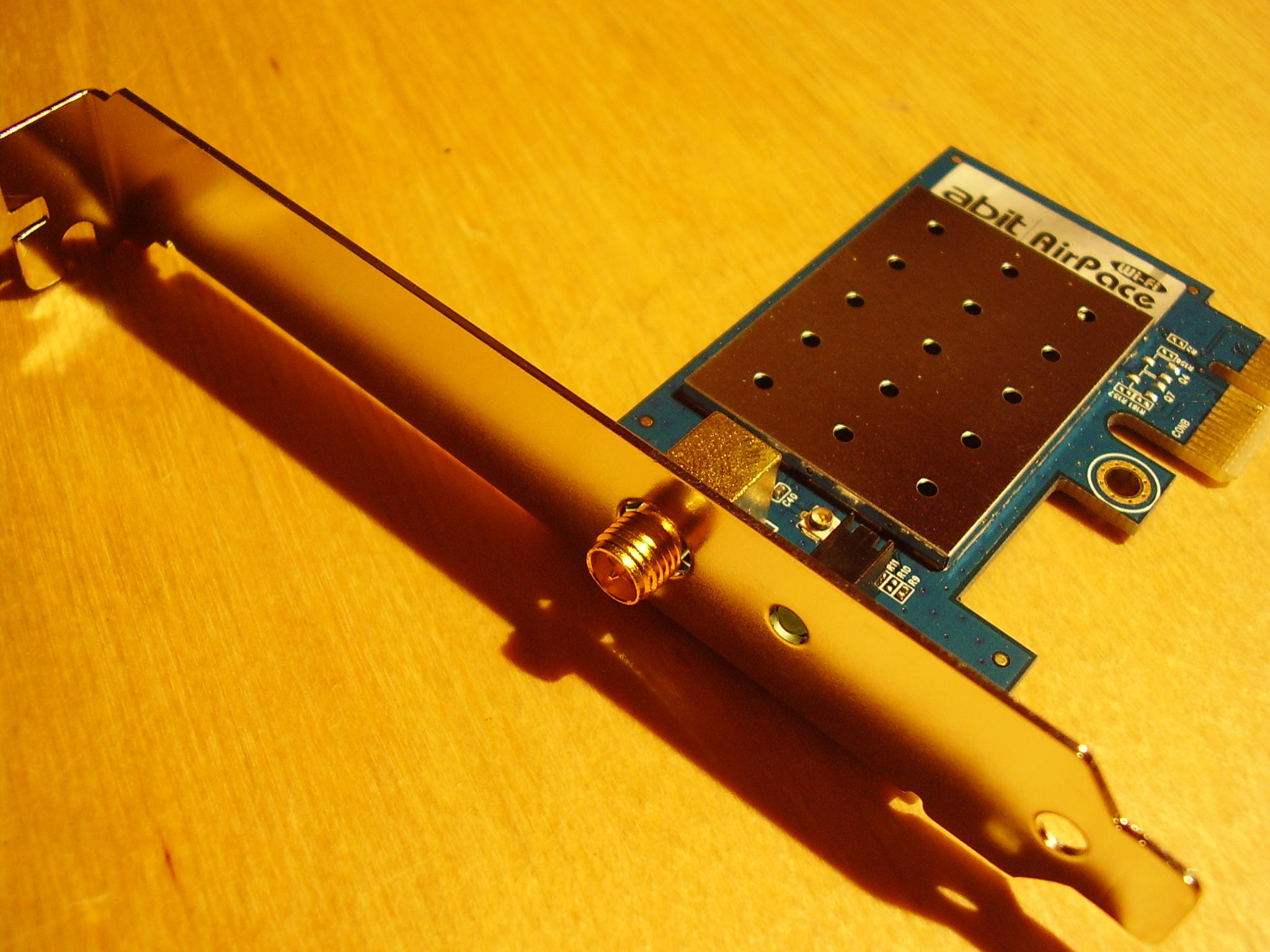
Abit Air Pace PCIe Wi-Fi card
