= ALi Corporation =

Manufacturing company

- Trade name: ALi
- Formerly: Acer Laboratories Incorporated; Acer Labs Inc.
- Company type: Public
- Industry: Semiconductor (fabless)
- Founded: 1987; 38 years ago
- Headquarters: Taiwan
- Key people: Teddy Lu (president)
- Products: Integrated circuits; Chipsets; Graphics chips

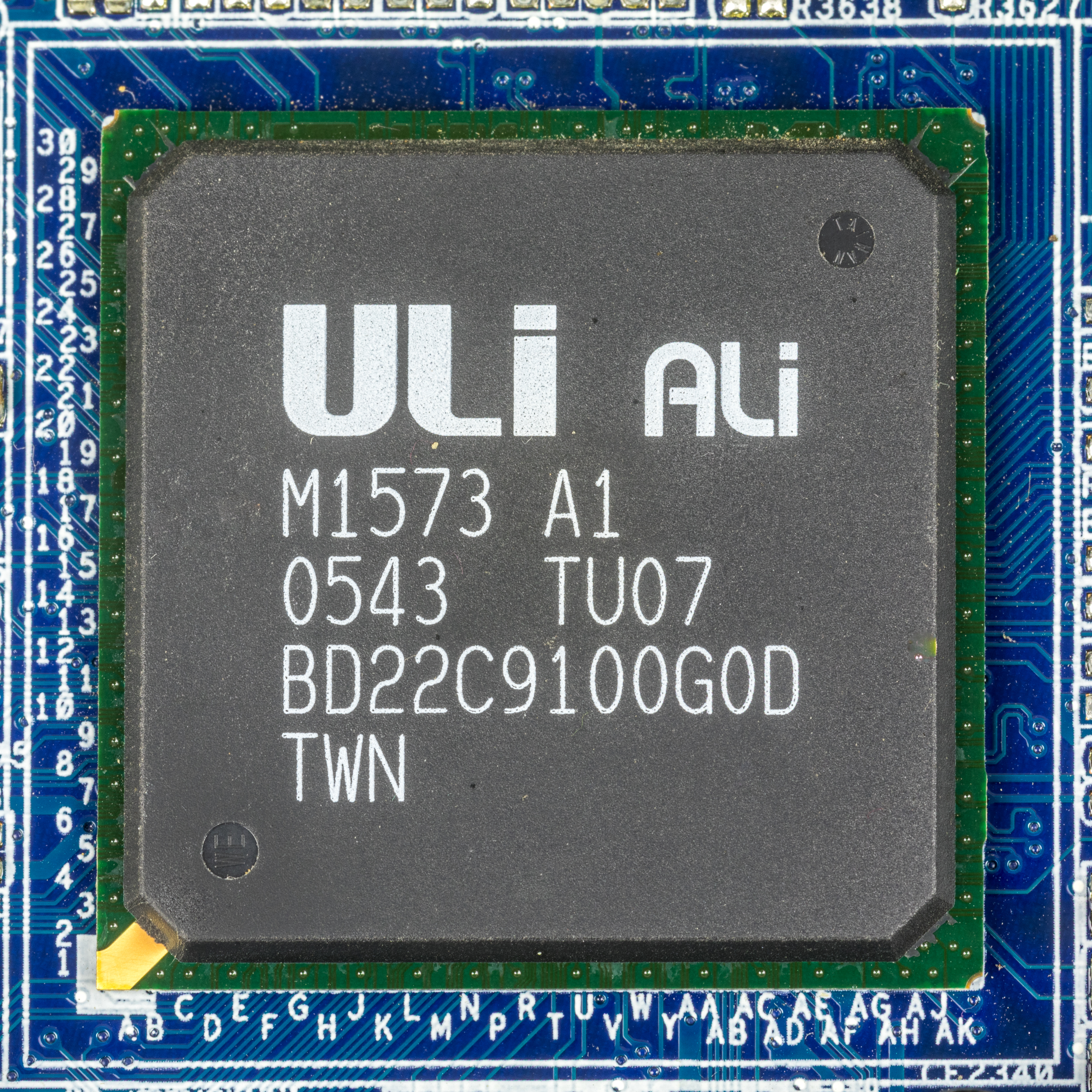
ALi / Uli M1573 southbridge chip with ALi as well ULi logo

ALi Corporation (formerly Acer Laboratories Incorporated or Acer Labs Inc., and commonly known as ALi) is a major designer and manufacturer of embedded systems integrated circuits, and a former manufacturer of personal computer integrated circuits. It is based in Taiwan, and was a subsidiary of the Acer group.

The company was founded in 1987, and later spun off from Acer group in 1993. Its president is Teddy Lu. Part of ALi including the personal computer integrated circuits business was spun off as ULi Electronics Inc. in June 2003. ULi was acquired by Nvidia in 2006 for $52 million.

== Products ==
=== Chipsets ===
==== 80X86 Chipsets ====
Chipset	Part Numbers	South Bridge	Release date	Processors	Bus Type	Max. FSB	Memory Types	Max. Memory Bus	Max. Memory	Max. Cache	PCI
	M1209		1991	386SX	ISA		FPM				None
	M1217			386SX	ISA		FPM EDO				None
	M1419	M1421	1991	386DX Socket 1 Socket 2	ISA		FPM				None
	M1429	M1431, M1435	1993	386DX Socket 2 Socket 3	VESA, PCI (w/ M1435)		FPM				2.0 w/ M1435
	M1439	M1445	1995	Socket 3	PCI		FPM				2.0
FINALi 486	M1489	M1487	1995	Socket 3	PCI	50 MHz	FPM EDO	50 MHz	128MB	1 MB	2.0

==== Pentium and Socket 7 Chipsets ====
Chipset	Part Numbers	South Bridge	Release date	Processors	Max. FSB	Memory Types	Max. Memory Bus	Max. memory	L2 Cache Type	Max. cache	Max. cacheable RAM	Parity/ ECC	PCI	AGP	IGP
ALADDiN	M1451	M1449		Socket 4 Socket 5	66 MHz	FPM	66 MHz	1 GB	Async	1 MB	51 2MB	Yes	2.1	No	No
ALADDiN II	M1511	M1512/M1513	1995	Socket 5/7	66 MHz	FPM EDO	66 MHz	768 MB	Async/Pburst	1 MB	?	Yes	2.1	No	No
ALADDiN III	M1521	M1523	1996	Socket 7	66 MHz	FPM EDO BEDO SDRAM	66 MHz	1 GB	Async/Pburst	1 MB	64 MB (8 bit tag), 512 MB (11 bit tag)	Yes	2.1	No	No
ALADDiN IV	M1531	M1533	1997	Socket 7	83 MHz	FPM EDO SDRAM	100 MHz	1 GB	Pburst	1 MB	64 MB (8 bit tag), 512 MB (11 bit tag)	Yes	2.1	No	No
ALADDiN IV+	M1531B	M1533/M1543	1997	Socket 7	83 MHz	FPM EDO SDRAM	100 MHz	1 GB	Pburst	1 MB	64 MB (8 bit tag), 512 MB (11 bit tag)	Yes	2.1	No	No
ALADDiN V for ATX, NLX, LPX form factor	M1541	M1543/M1543C	1998	Super Socket 7	100 MHz	FPM EDO SDRAM	100 MHz	4 GB	Pburst	1 MB	128 MB (8 bit tag/older rev), 1GB (10 bit tag/Rev F/G)	Yes	2.1	2x	No
ALADDiN V for Baby AT form factor	M1542	M1543/M1543C	1998	Super Socket 7	100 MHz	FPM EDO SDRAM	100 MHz	4 GB	Pburst	1 MB	128 MB (8 bit tag/older rev), 1GB (10 bit tag/Rev F/G)	Yes	2.1	2x	No
ALADDiN 7 ArtX	M1561	M1535D	1999	Super Socket 7	100 MHz	SDRAM	100 MHz	1 GB	No external cache support	N/A	N/A		2.1	No	ArtX IGP

==== Slot 1 and Socket 370 Chipsets ====
Chipset	Part Numbers	South Bridge	Release date	Processors	FSB	Memory Types	Memory Bus	Max. memory	Parity/ ECC	PCI	AGP	IGP
ALADDiN PRO II	M1621	M1543/M1543C		Pentium II	66/100 MHz	EDO, SDRAM	66 - 100 MHz	2 GB	Yes	2.1	2x	No
ALADDiN TNT	M1631	M1535/M1535D		Pentium II, Pentium III, Celeron	66/100/133 MHz	EDO, SDRAM	66 - 133 MHz	1.5 GB	ECC	2.2	2x	NVIDIA TNT2
CyberBLADE ALADDiN i1	M1632M	M1535		Mobile Pentium II/Pentium III	66/100/133 MHz	EDO, SDRAM	66 - 133 MHz	1.5 GB	ECC	2.2	2x	Trident CyberBlade 3D
ALADDiN PRO 4	M1641	M1535/M1535D		Pentium II, Pentium III, Celeron	66/100 MHz	EDO, SDRAM	66 - 133 MHz	1.5 GB	ECC	2.2	4x	No
CyberALADDiN	M1644	M1535D+		Pentium II, Pentium III, Celeron	66/100/133 MHz	SDRAM, DDR	100/133 MHz SDRAM, 200/266 MHz DDR	3 GB	ECC	2.2	4x	Trident CyberBlade XP
CyberALADDiN-T	M1644T	M1535D+		Pentium II, Pentium III, Pentium III Tualatin, Celeron	66/100/133 MHz	SDRAM, DDR	100/133 MHz SDRAM, 200/266 MHz DDR	3 GB	ECC	2.2	4x	Trident CyberBlade XP
ALADDiN PRO 5	M1651	M1535D+		Pentium II, Pentium III, Celeron	100/133 MHz	SDRAM, DDR	100/133 MHz SDRAM, 200/266 MHz DDR	3 GB	ECC	2.2	4x	No
ALADDiN PRO 5T	M1651T	M1535D+		Pentium II, Pentium III, Pentium III Tualatin, Celeron	100/133 MHz	SDRAM, DDR	100/133 MHz SDRAM, 200/266 MHz DDR	3 GB	ECC	2.2	4x	No

==== Slot A and Socket A Chipsets ====
Chipset	Part Numbers	South Bridge	Release date	Processors	FSB	Memory Types	Memory Bus	Max. memory	AGP	IGP
CyberMAGiK 1	M1646	M1535+		Mobile Athlon/Athlon XP/Duron	200/266 MHz	SDRAM, DDR	100/133 MHz SDRAM, 200/266 MHz DDR	3 GB	4x	Trident CyberBlade XP
MAGiK 1	M1647	M1535D+		Athlon, Athlon XP, Duron	200/266 MHz	SDRAM, DDR	100/133 MHz SDRAM, 200/266 MHz DDR	3 GB	4x	No
MAGiK 1 SDRAM	M1649	M1535D+		Athlon, Athlon XP, Duron	200/266 MHz	SDRAM	100/133 MHz SDRAM	3 GB	4x	No
MAGiK 2 (Note: Canceled)	M1667	M1563		Athlon, Athlon XP, Duron	200/266 MHz	SDRAM, DDR	100/133 MHz SDRAM, 200/266/333 MHz DDR		8x	No

==== Socket 478 Chipsets ====
Chipset	Part Numbers	South Bridge	Release date	Processors	FSB	Memory Types	Memory Bus	Max. memory	AGP	IGP
ALADDiN-P4	M1671	M1535D+		Pentium 4, Celeron	400 MHz	SDRAM, DDR	100/133 MHz SDRAM, 200/266/333 MHz DDR	3 GB	4x	No
CyberALADDiN-P4	M1672	M1535+		Mobile Pentium 4/Celeron	400 MHz	SDRAM, DDR	100/133 MHz SDRAM, 200/266 MHz DDR	3 GB	4x	Trident CyberBlade XP2
A8XN	M1681	M1563		Pentium 4, Celeron	400/533 MHz	SDRAM, DDR	100/133 MHz SDRAM, 200/266/333/400 MHz DDR	3 GB	8x	No
A800N	M1683	M1563		Pentium 4, Celeron	400/533/800 MHz	SDRAM, DDR	100/133 MHz SDRAM, 200/266/333/400 MHz DDR	3 GB	8x	No

==== Socket 754/939/940 Chipsets ====
Chipset	Part Numbers	South Bridge	Release date	Processors	HyperTransport	Memory Types	Memory Bus	Max. memory	AGP	PCI-e	IGP
ALi M1687	M1687	M1563		Athlon 64, Sempron	1600 MT/s	DDR	200/266/333 MHz DDR	4 GB	8x	No	No
ULi M1689	M1689	Integrated		Athlon 64, Athlon 64 X2, Sempron	2000 MT/s	DDR	266/333/400 MHz DDR	4 GB	8x	No	No
ULi M1695	M1695	M1567		Athlon 64, Athlon 64 X2, Sempron	2000 MT/s	DDR	266/333/400 MHz DDR	4 GB	8x	x16	No
ULi M1697	M1697	Integrated		Athlon 64, Athlon 64 X2, Sempron	2000 MT/s	DDR	266/333/400 MHz DDR	4 GB	No	x16	No

==== Southbridge Chips ====
Part Numbers	NB Interconnect	PATA	SATA	SATA RAID	PCI	USB	Audio	Ethernet
M1487	PCI	PIO 0/1/2/3/4			2.0	No	No	No
M1523	PCI	UDMA 33			2.1	No	No	No
M1523B	PCI	UDMA 33			2.1	2× 1.0	No	No
M1533	PCI	UDMA 33			2.1	2× 1.0	No	No
M1543	PCI	UDMA 33/66			2.1	2× 1.0	No	No
M1543C	PCI	UDMA 33/66			2.1	3× 1.0	No	No
M1535/M1535D	PCI	UDMA 33/66			2.2	4× 1.0	AC'97 2.1	No
M1535+/M1535D+	PCI	UDMA 33/66/100			2.2	6× 1.1	AC'97 2.1	No
M1563	HyperTransport 800MT/s	UDMA 33/66/100/133			2.2	6× 2.0	AC'97 2.2	10/100Mbps
M1567	HyperTransport 1000MT/s	UDMA 33/66/100/133	1.0 (1.5 Gbit/s)	0/1/JBOD	2.2	8× 2.0	AC'97 2.2	10/100Mbps
M1573 (Note: Used with ATI Radeon Xpress 200 chipsets (RS480, RX480))	PCI Express	UDMA 33/66/100/133	1.0 (1.5 Gbit/s)	0/1/JBOD	2.3	8× 2.0	HD Audio	10/100Mbps
M1575 (Note: Used with ATI Radeon Xpress 200 chipsets (RS482, RS485, RD480))	PCI Express	UDMA 33/66/100/133	2.0 (3 Gbit/s)	0/1/0+1/5/JBOD	2.3	8× 2.0	HD Audio	10/100Mbps
M1689 (Note: Table shows the I/O capabilities of these single-chip chipsets, which do not have a physical "southbridge".)	N/A	UDMA 33/66/100/133	1.0 (1.5 Gbit/s)	0/1/JBOD	2.3	8× 2.0	AC'97 2.2	10/100Mbps
M1697	N/A	UDMA 33/66/100/133	2.0 (3 Gbit/s)	0/1/0+1/5/JBOD	2.3	8× 2.0	HD Audio	10/100Mbps

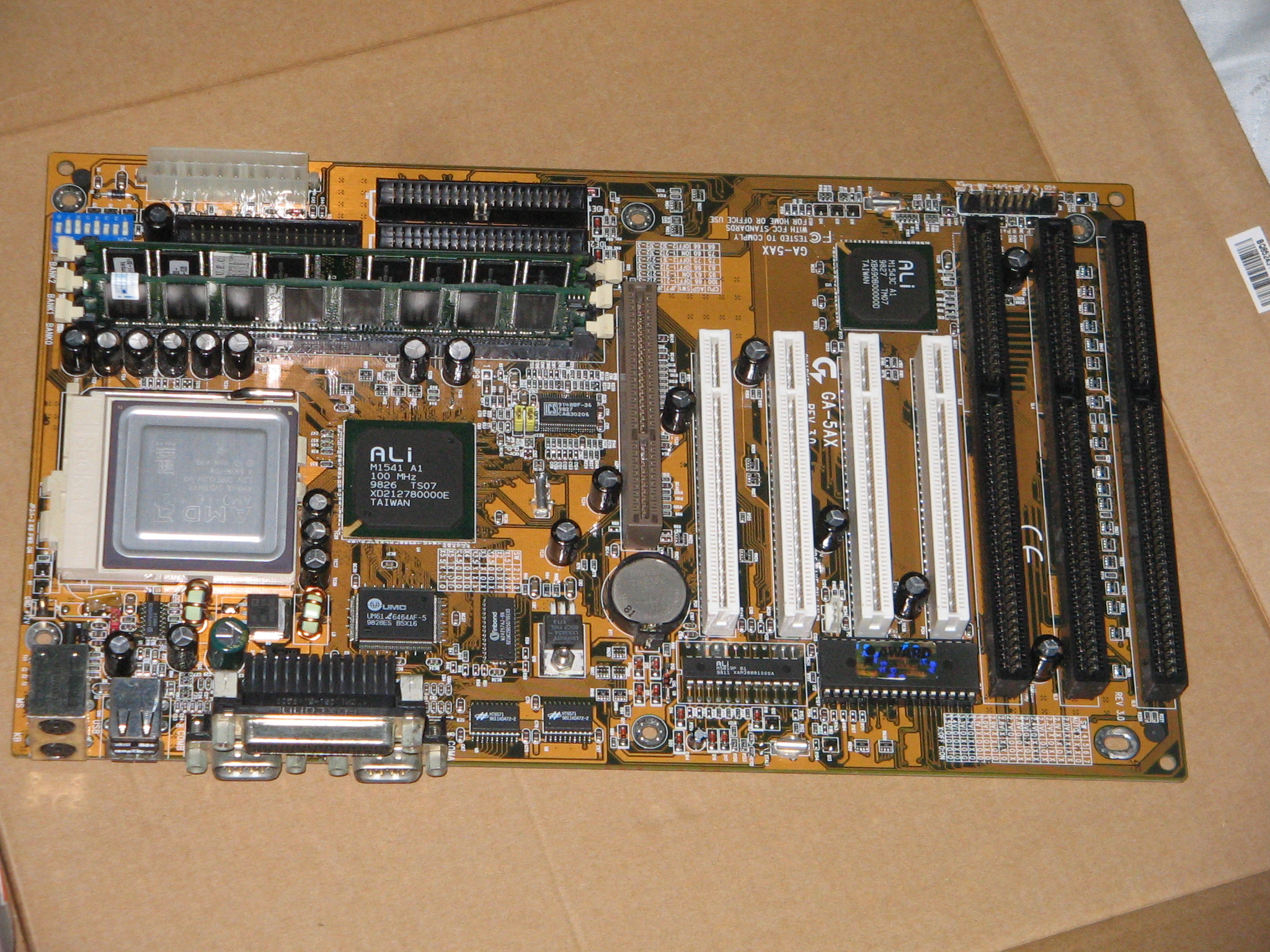
ALi M1541-based motherboard with AMD K6-2 300 MHz processor

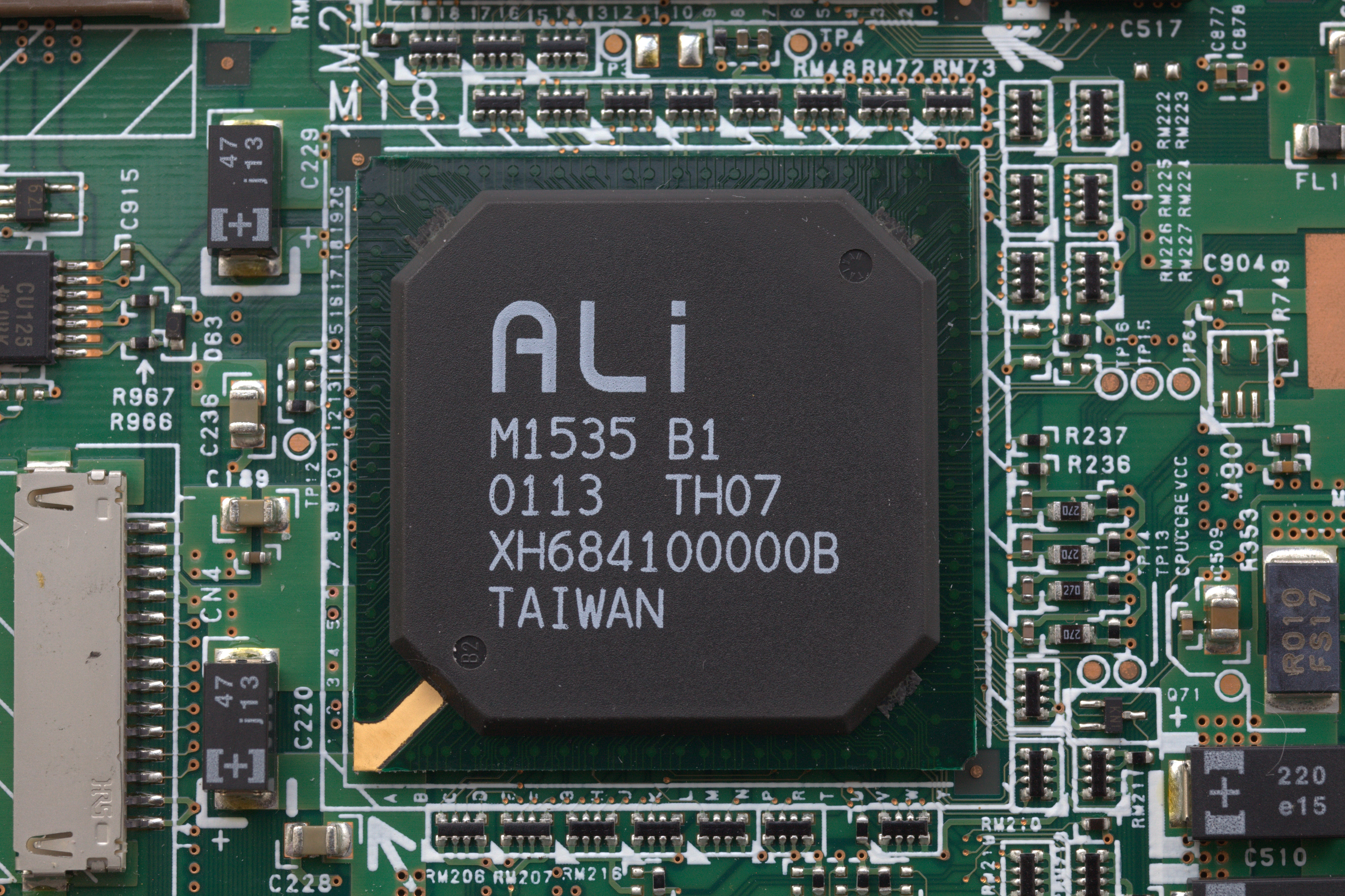
ALi M1535 southbridge chip from a Fujitsu Lifebook P series laptop

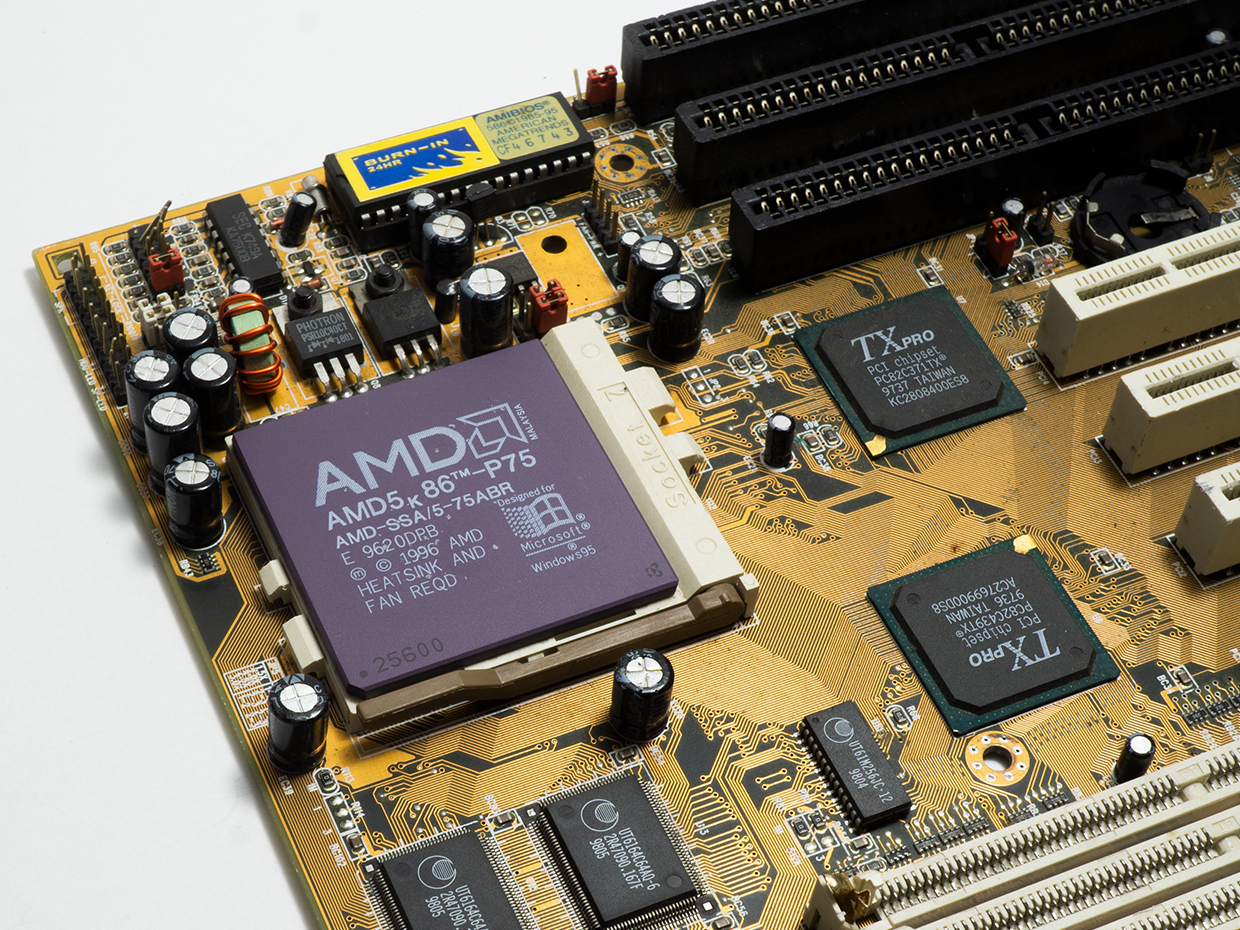
ALi ALADDiN IV Relabeled TX Pro chipset on a socket 7 motherboard with AMD K5

=== VGA ===
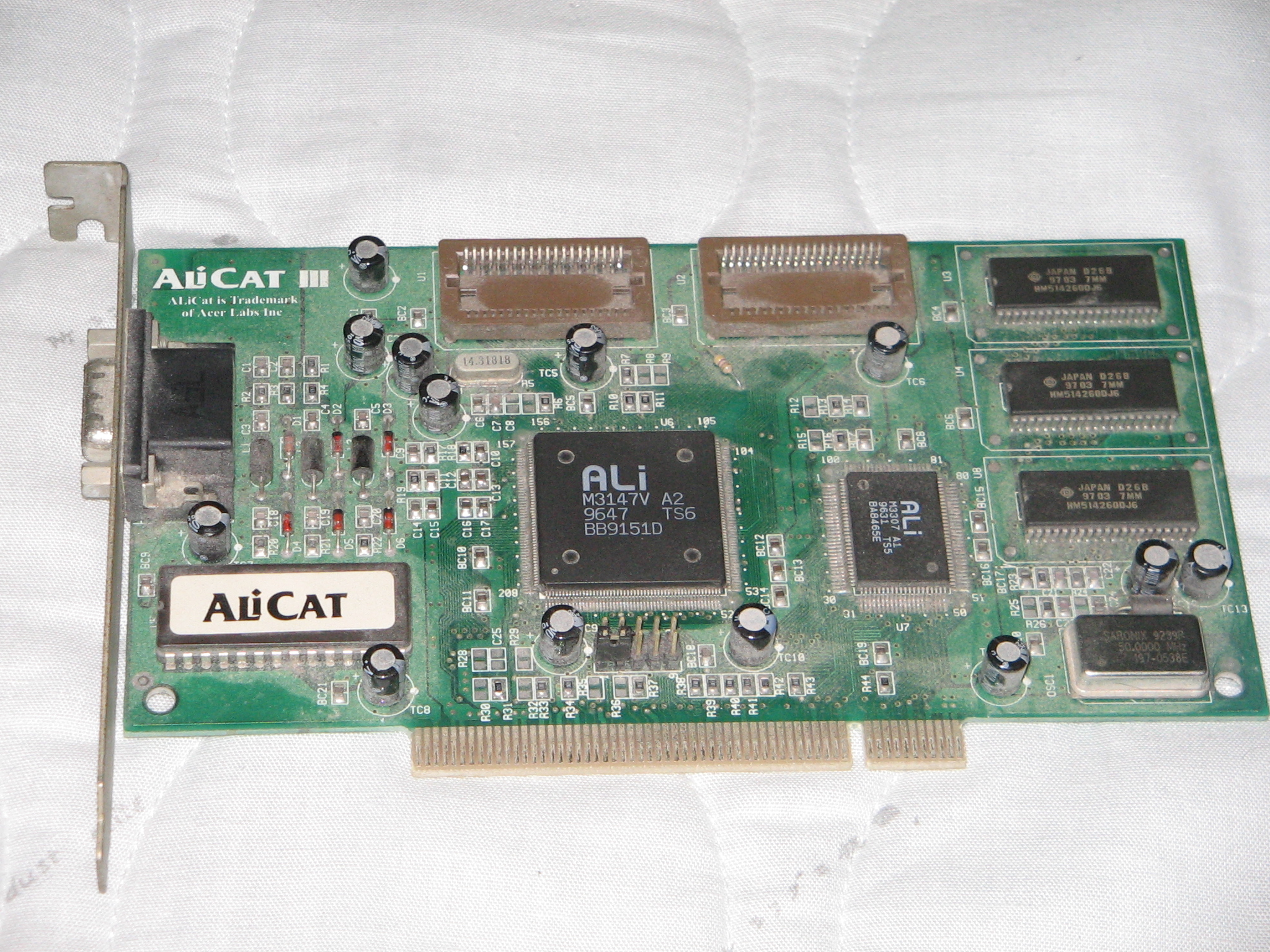
A M3147V VGA video card

- M3141
- M3143
- M3145A AliCat - PCI SVGA card, 2 MB DRAM, external RAMDAC, no DDC support - most likely S3 Trio64V+ compatible
- M3147V AliCat - PCI SVGA card, 2 MB (S3 Trio 64V+ compatible ?)
- M3149 GUI Accelerator, 4 MB
- M3151 GUI Accelerator, 8 MB

=== Video ===
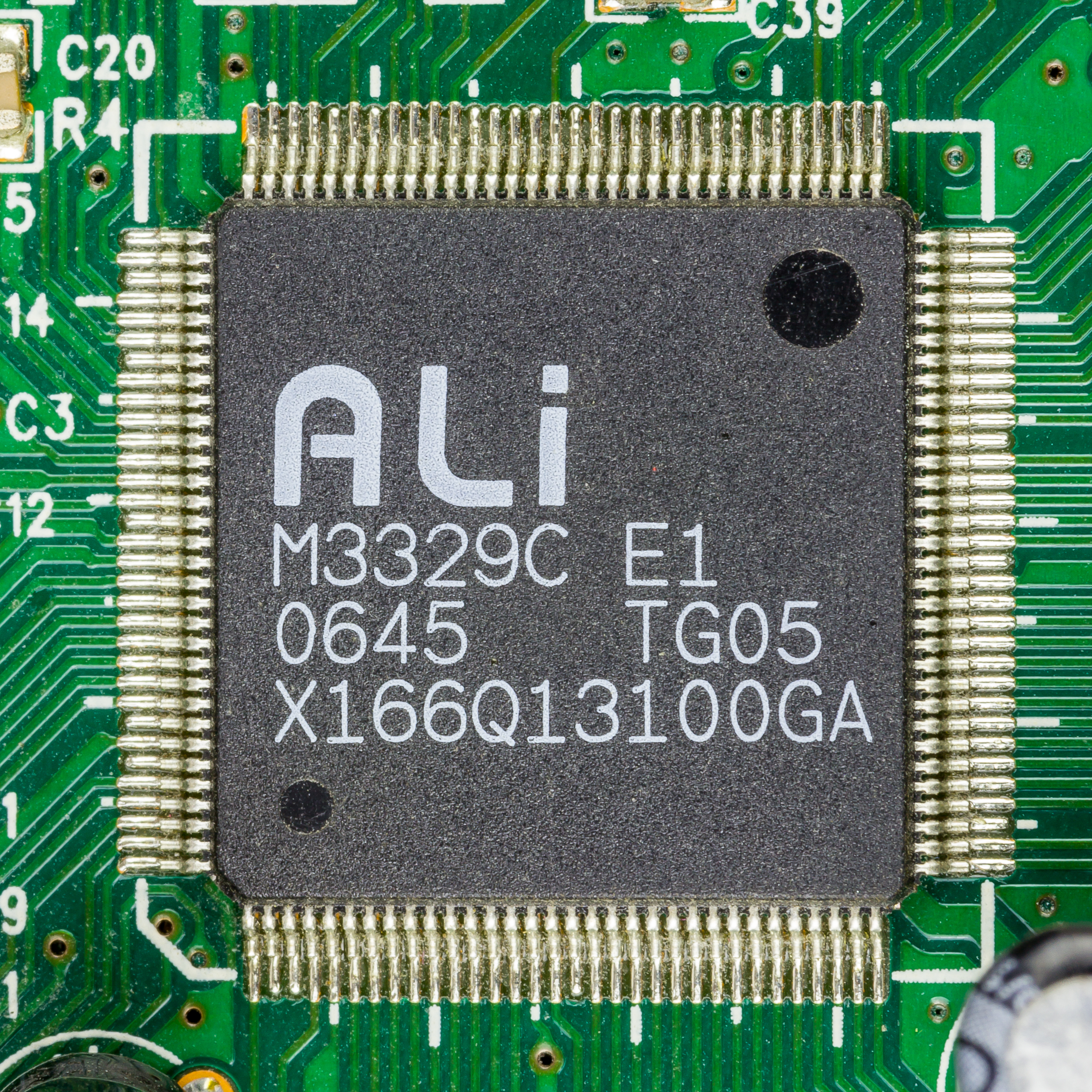
M3329 E1

- M3307 MPEG-I Video Controller
- M3309 MPEG-II Video w/ Software Audio Decoder
- M3321 MPEG-II Audio/Video Decoder
- M3325 Video/Audio Decoder
- M3327 CPU
- M3328 CPU

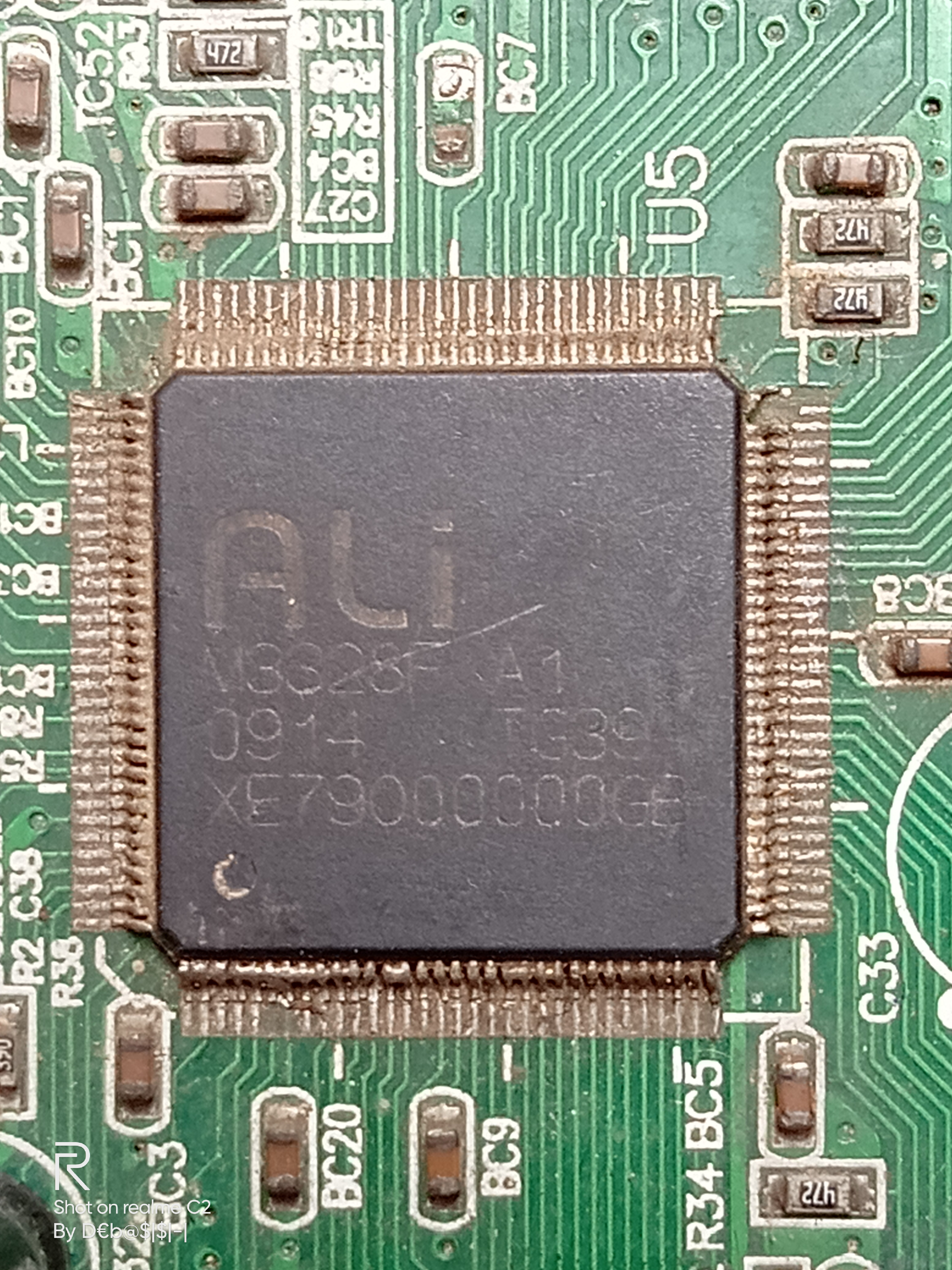
ALi M3328F A1

- M3329 CPU (MIPS architecture)
  - A1 (216 pin)
  - B1 (216 pin)
  - C E1 (128 pin)
    - PF (parallel)
    - SF (serial)
- M3330 CPU

=== PC peripheral ===
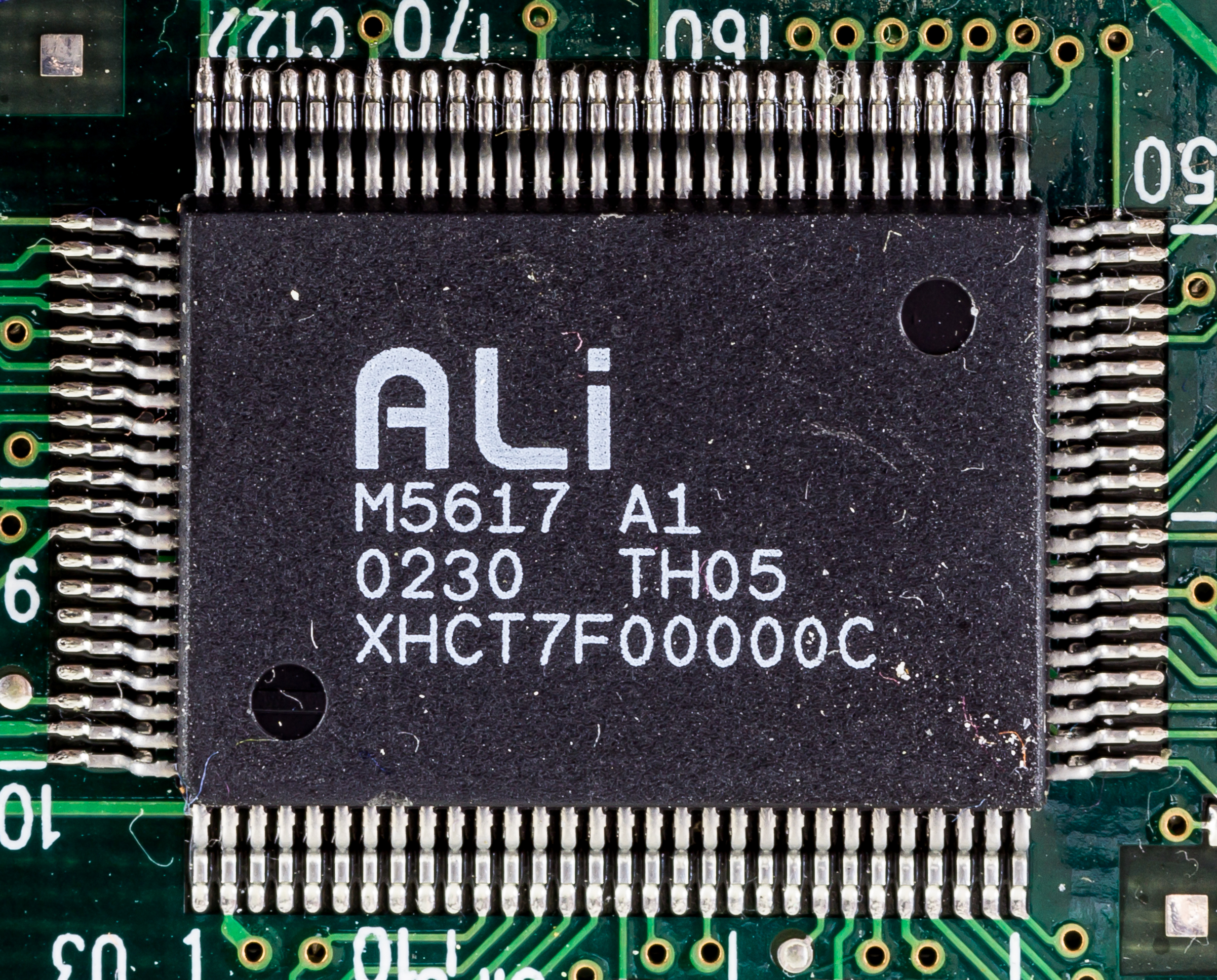
An ALi M5617 USB Scanner Controller

- M5105, M5107, M5109, M5113, M5119 SuperIO chip
- M5123, M5125, M5132, M5135, M5140, M5145 SuperIO chip with KBC integrated
- M5253, M5271, M5273, M5622, M5633 USB/FireWire PCI chipsets
- M5281, M5283, M5619, M5621, M5636, M5637, M5642 PCI IDE
- M5455 PCI AC'97 Sound
- M5623 (USB 2.0), M5617 (USB 1.1) USB Scanner controller
- M5632 USB Host-to-host
- M5634, M5651 USB flash drive controller, probably clone of Phison chips
- M5635 USB Cardreader
- M5661, M5667, M7101, M7107, M7108 digital audio player controller
- M5818 RTC chip, clone of Motorola MC146818

=== For embedded systems ===
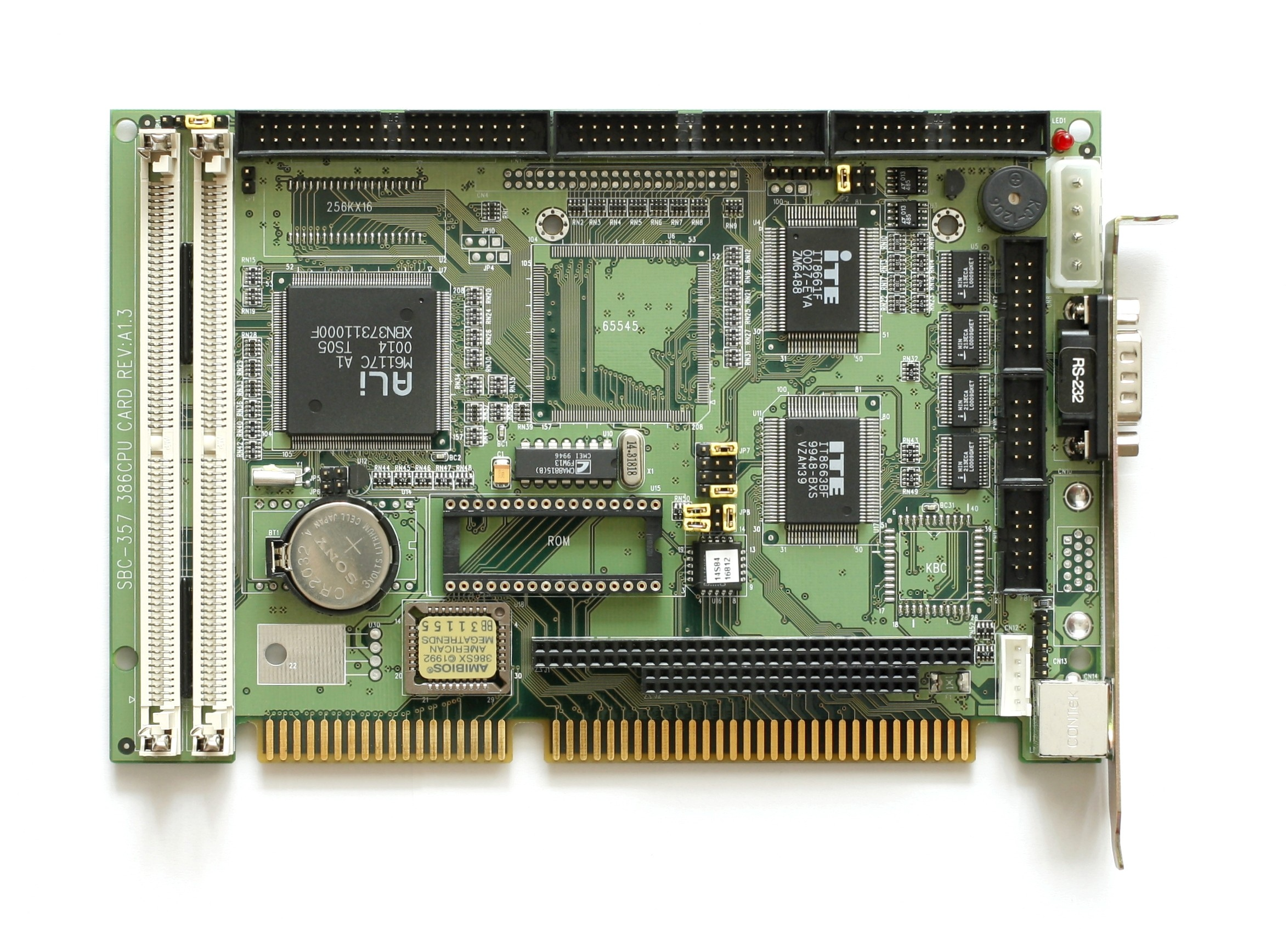
ISA Slot Single-board computer card with ALi M6117 and connector for PC104

M6117 is a highly integrated, low voltage, single-chip implementation of the Intel 386SX compatible microprocessor subsystem plus ALi M1217 chipset. The M6117 provides a static 386SX core derived from V.M. Technology VM386SX+ microprocessor, a DRAM controller, ISA bus logic, a real time clock, a keyboard controller, and a power management unit.

M6032 is an 8051-based Microcontroller with Dual Data Pointers, UART, 32 I/O lines, 3 Timers/Counters, 6 Interrupts/2 priority levels, 256 Bytes IDATA RAM, 256 Bytes on-chip XRAM.

M6759 is an 8051-based Microcontroller with Dual Data Pointers, UART, 32 I/O lines, 3 Timers/Counters, 6 Interrupts/2 priority levels, 64 KB Flash ROM, 256 Bytes IDATA RAM, 256 Bytes on-chip XRAM.

== See also ==
- Comparison of AMD chipsets
- Comparison of ATI chipsets
- List of Intel chipsets
- Comparison of Nvidia chipsets
- List of VIA chipsets
