= TV-out =

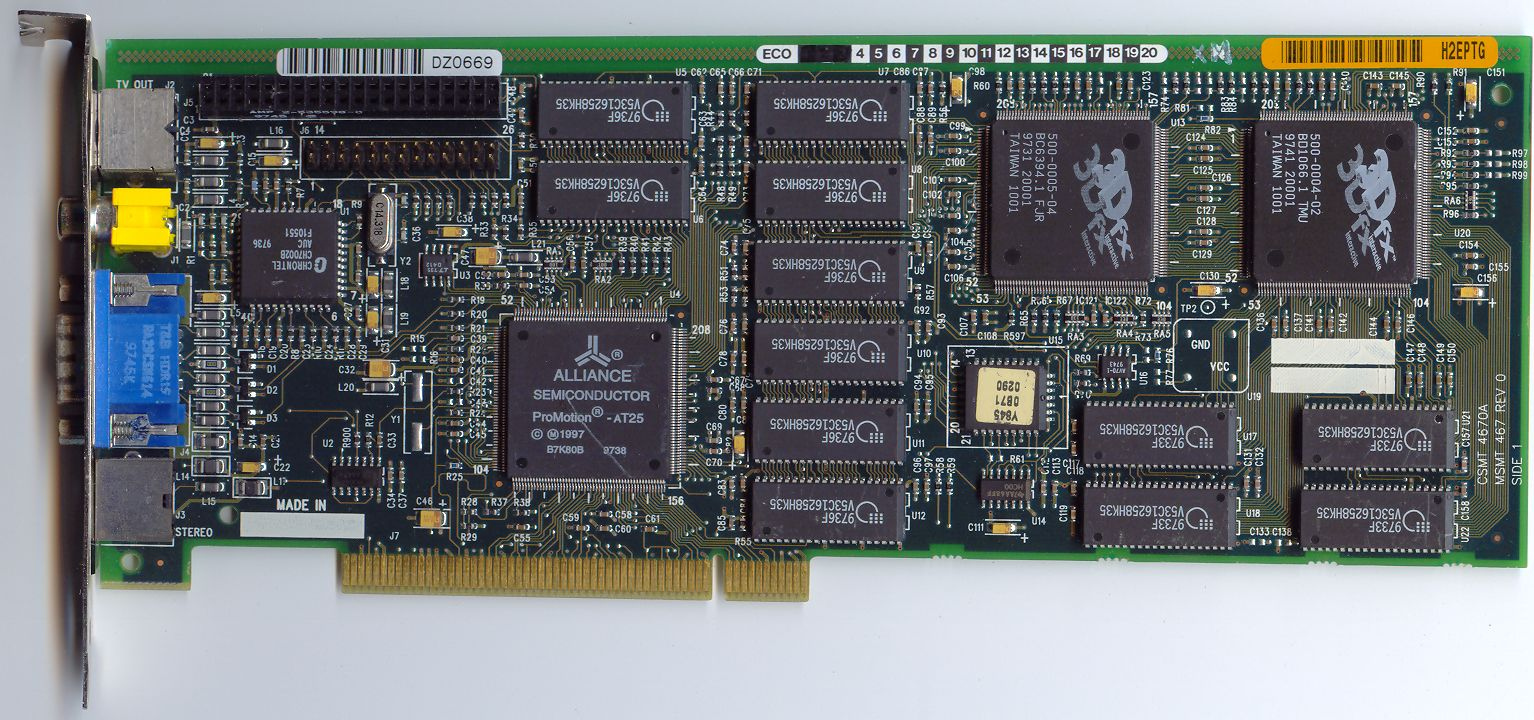
TV-out on an Intergraph Intense3D Voodoo Rush; S-video (first connector) and composite video (yellow RCA connector below)

The term TV-out is commonly used to label the connector of equipment providing an analog video signal acceptable for a television AV input. TV-out is different from AV-out in that it only provides video, no audio.

Types of signals and their respective connectors include:

- Composite video
- S-video
- Component video

On a PC the TV-out typically requires a driver that supports the chipset controlling the usage of the output.

See AV input for more information.
