= EPoX =

- Industry: Computer
- Founded: 1995; 31 years ago
- Defunct: 2009; 17 years ago
- Headquarters: Taipei, Taiwan
- Products: Motherboards, Multimedia, Bluetooth equipment
- Operating income: $ 35.5 Million (end of Year 2004)
- Number of employees: 200
- Website: www.epox.com (now defunct)

EPoX was a manufacturer of motherboards, video cards and communication products. They manufactured mainboards for AMD and Intel processors, which were renowned for being overclocker-friendly yet affordable. Many of their products used the same StudlyCaps naming convention as the company itself.

== History ==
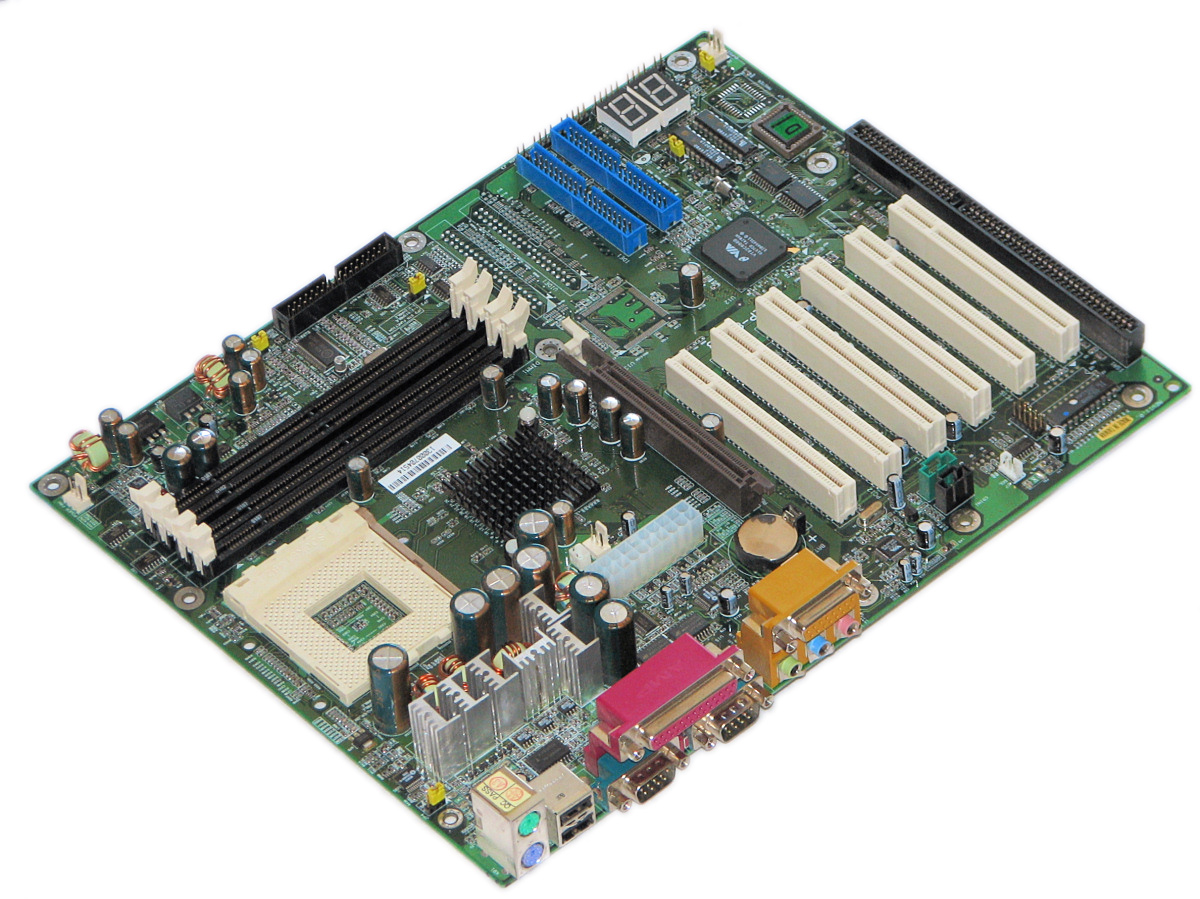
An EPoX motherboard

EPoX Computer Company was established in February 1995. In 1998 the company entered the communications field. EPoX has been listed since November 1999 on the Taiwan Stock Exchange. (TAIEX: 5414)

EPoX was the first mainboard producer in the industry to announce the user-friendly technology KBPO (Keyboard Power On) in 1997. Their mainboards were manufactured in Jong Ho City, Taipei, and Ning-Bo Science Based Industrial Park, China.

All branches (Taiwan, German, United States and Dutch) of EPoX closed in 2007.

EPoX's old employees started a new company in 2009 called SUPoX which is only active in China.

SUPoX supports all EPoX boards beginning from Slot 1 on their site.

== See also ==
- List of companies of Taiwan
