= DFI =

Taiwanese industrial computer company

DFI Inc.
- Native name: 友通資訊股份有限公司
- Type: Public
- Traded as: TWSE: 2397
- Industry: Computer hardware Electronics; Embedded; Industrial
- Founded: 1981; 45 years ago
- Founder: Y.C. Lu
- Headquarters: New Taipei City, Taiwan
- Area served: Worldwide
- Key people: Peter Chen (Chairman); Alexander Su (President)
- Products: Industrial motherboard System on module Embedded system Industrial display
- Revenue: ▲US$230 Million (2019)
- Number of employees: 725 worldwide (180+ R&D)
- Parent: Qisda Corporation
- Website: www.dfi.com

DFI (Diamond Flower Inc) is a Taiwanese industrial computer company with headquarters in Taipei. It designs, develops, manufactures, and sells industrial motherboard, industrial PCs, System-on-Module, industrial displays, and ODM/OEM services.

DFI was founded by Y.C Lu on July 14, 1981, developing and selling electronics components and add-on cards in the beginning. However, DFI switched to the production of motherboards after searching for potential markets and deciding to focus on the strengths of DFI. Targeting the new growing market in motherboard products, DFI announced the Patent License Agreement with Intel Corporation to build partnership with Intel in 1990 and has been developing and manufacturing motherboard products since 1992. With continuous dedication, DFI quickly gained a reputation in Asia-Pacific region after five years and was awarded Top 10 Motherboard Manufacturer in CRN Magazine from the year 1997 to 1999. Starting from 1998, DFI began to follow the strategies of Intel by releasing Intel 440BX series motherboards, 810 motherboards, and 810e motherboards to worldwide markets. Since its growing advances in manufacturing motherboards, DFI was awarded the Intel Global Demo Board manufacturer award in 1998 and 1999 respectively.

Catering to the growing market of high-end motherboards, DFI aimed to develop advanced overclocking motherboards, the LanParty series, which has been aimed to be a segment for small powerful computers that meet the requirements of end users in the 2000s. DFI introduced the junior lineup ("JR") with two products, the P45 and 790GX, which has since been extended with Nvidia and X58 chipsets. Other LanParty series include the LT, DK (Dark), and the LanParty UT.

With blossoming business in the market, DFI went public and launched its initial public offering (IPO) on January 15, 2000. DFI has already gained a reputation from its motherboard products and hot-selling lineup, LanParty, at that time. And aside from developing LanParty consumer products, DFI started to develop ACP (Application Control Platform) businesses, mainly targeted at vertical applications in slot machine, POS, security system, and so on since 2002. In 2005, DFI gained over 50% revenues from this new business. With this successful transformation, industrial computer became the primary business of DFI. As of 2003, DFI's renowned overclocked gamer motherboard, LANPARTY NFII ULTRA, was awarded the Chief Editor Choice Award in PC Magazine and the Best Creativity Award in Tom's Hardware Guide.

Since DFI planned to focus on developing embedded system products, not only did they stop developing Consumer Product Line, but also started establishing embedded system developments and designs in 2011 to expand its industrial computer business.

== History ==
=== 1981–1991 ===
In 1981, Y.C Lu founded DFI Electronics Components Inc. in Taipei, Taiwan; mainly supplying and exporting electronics components with $1 million in capital. During the first year, DFI earned a revenue of $30 million. In 1984, DFI established facility in Taipei and began manufacturing and selling computers and peripherals. When the capital increased up to $10 million, the Sales (Revenue) Growth Rate of DFI also increased to 300% and DFI successfully expanded its operations to the American regions as well as earning nearly $1 billion in revenues. In 1987, with the capital of $30 million, DFI started to establish facility in Hsi-Chih City, Taiwan. At the same time, DFI planned to stretch its product line into the European markets, starting with Germany and England. As of 1988, the facility relocated to Hsi-Chih City, which was the major facility of DFI. With the expansion of production line and the addition of Automatic Test Equipment (ATE), DFI not only upgraded the quality of products, but also released a handheld scanner. As of 1989, DFI added Computer Aided Design System (CAD) to its facility to manufacture more products like computer mouse, handheld scanner, personal computer, and add-on card, etc. In 1990, DFI announced its Patent License Agreement with Intel Corporation and became the first company with an assembly production line in America to enable technical support service in cooperation with Intel. DFI's capital increased to $196 million and expanded its facility to 1,900 square feet in 1991.

=== 1992–2000 ===
As of 1992, DFI introduced ICT and SMT devices into its facility to increase the manufacturing quality and efficiency. In 1993, DFI continually expanded the facility, which was located in Hsi-Chih City and was 2,300 square feet. DFI's business office and Research and Development Department moved to the facility and introduced Green PC with energy-efficiency design into the facility. As of 1994, DFI researched and developed CD-ROM, officially entered into multimedia system market. The revenue of the notebook increased to over $100 million and the overall revenue of 1994 increased by 25%, over $2 billion. As of 1996, DFI transformed the CD-ROM facility into an assembly system facility, designing and manufacturing the world's first 75MHZ system bus motherboard, which supported the CYRIX PR 200+CPU. In the meantime, DFI began establishing the third SMT assembly and adopted Siemens SIPLACE80S-15 high speed CNC machine to increase the production of motherboards to 40,000 pcs per month, as well as increasing the self-production to 120, 000 per month. After manufacturing 586 motherboards that supported dual CPU, DFI was dominant in the motherboard market and targeted developing countries, accommodating to Philips Asian marketing system. As of 1997, DFI expanded the facility in Hsi-Chih City for the third time, totaling the area to 2, 800 square feet. DFI also expanded 2 surface mount technology (SMT) high speed CNC machines to upgrade the production of motherboards to 180, 000 pcs per month. Devoted to developing Philips and Lemel assembly OEM business, DFI manufactured 10, 000 systems every month. At the same time, DFI established a third OEM assembly facility in Dongguan city, China and built a European branch office in Bremen, Germany in order to advance the quality of services in European regions. Being engaged in the server market, DFI got started in designing and developing motherboards that support SCSI onboard and Dual Pentium CPU in 1997. From the year of 1997 to 1999, DFI was awarded the Top 10 Motherboard Manufacturer in CRN (Computer Reseller New) Magazine, which had already gained attention by the worldwide market due to DFI's motherboards' design and development. In April, 1998, DFI was preparing to apply for becoming a listed company at Taipei Exchange (TPEx) and TWSE. In the same year, DFI released Intel 440BX series motherboard, which was in line with Intel. The 810 motherboard of DFI was awarded the Demo Board amongst Intel Asia-Pacific region. In February, 1999, P5BV3+motherboards was awarded the high performance Socket7 motherboard in Computer World Magazine in China. In early May of the same year, DFI launched 810 motherboard to the market, following the release of Intel and had already gone into mass production worldwide. The 810e motherboard was re-awarded Intel Global Demo Board and was launched to the market in September, 1999. DFI went public and launched its initial public offering (IPO) on 15, January, 2000. During the same year, DFI founded Diamond Flower H.T. Group (BVI) Inc.

=== 2001–2005 ===
In April 2001, DFI's facilities added the seventh SMT assembly line, increasing productivity to 30,000 pieces per month. As of 2002, DFI added the eighth SMT assembly line into factory. In the same year, DFI established worldwide office located in Tokyo, Japan, developing ACP (applied computing platform) businesses for vertical applications and starting to focus on high profit motherboards. In the same year, the local office in Europe relocated to Rotterdam-Hoogvliet in the Netherlands, setting a service center in Eastern Europe, Poland. In 2003, DFI's renowned gamer overclocking motherboard, LANPARTY NFII ULTRA, was awarded LANPARTY.com Highly Commended Prize, PC Professionell Magazine Extreme Award, Chief Editor Choice Award in PC Magazine and awarded the Best Creativity Award in Tom's Hardware Guild. In 2004, DFI launched a product line based on Intel 940 Series Chipsets (code name: Calistoga), covering different form factors from COM Express Basic, G5C900-B, Mini-ITX motherboard, CT132-B, to ST100-G5C embedded system,. As of 2005, DFI's capital increased to NTD 1.097 billion, profiting in ACP (Applied Computing Platform) business and gained over 50% revue from this new business. Through this increasingly developed new business, industrial computer has become the major business of DFI. In 2005, DFI launched a product line based on Intel 960 Series Chipsets (code name: Broadwater,) including different form factors such as microATX motherboard, G7B336-P, ATX motherboard, G7B630-B/N. DFI also launched the panel PC, FS200-BMX5, which was based on ARM Cortex-A8 Freescale i.MX53 processors.

=== 2006–2010 ===
As of 2006, GE became the vital investor of DFI, benefiting from a large amount of DFI's business as well as acquiring 100% equity of DFI-Japan. With the acquisition cost of NTD 24.55 million, it allowed DFI to completely devote itself to in-depth industrial computer market in Japan. In the following three years, the consolidated revenue growth rate in ACP (Applied Computing Platform) business increased over 51%. DFI then launched a product line based on

Intel 960 Series Chipsets (code name: Crestline), including different form factors consisting of SR100-L20C Mini-ITX motherboard and SR330-L microATX motherboard. In the same year, DFI also launched a product line based on Intel 945P Chipsets (code name: Lakeport), covering different form factors like G7L331-B microATX motherboard and LT600-D ATX motherboard. As of 2007, DFI's capital increased to NTD1.14 billion as well as a 65.77% equity of DFI-ITOX with acquisition cost of NTD 234 million. To guarantee exceptional quality and reliability of products under rigorous quality standards, DFI's products were approved by QC080000, WASO14001, and Green Partner certifications in 2007. DFI launched a product line based on Intel G41 Chipsets (code name: Eagle Lake), inclusive of EL109-N Mini-ITX motherboard, EL339-B microATX motherboard, and EL620-C ATX motherboard, as well as HNVR320-EL embedded system. In 2007, DFI also released a product line based on Intel Q35 Chipsets (code name: Bearlake), ranging from BL100-NE/PE Mini-ITX motherboard, to BL330-B microATX motherboard, to BL631-D ATX motherboard, As of 2008, DFI's capital increased to NTD 1.19 billion, acquiring 100% equity of YAN TONG TECHNOLOGYLTD with acquisition cost of NTD 187.26 million, as well as increasing the capital to DFI-Japan to JPY 280 million. In 2008, DFI released a product line based on Intel GM45 Chipsets (code name: Cantiga), ranging from CA900-B COM Express Basic, to small form factor CA230-BF Mini-DTX board, to CA101-D Mini-ITX motherboard, to CA331-P microATX motherboard. Furthermore, DFI launched a product series based on Intel Atom Processor Z500 series (code name: Silverthorne), offering from ML905-B11C/B16C COM Express, to small form factor ML936-B11C/B16C board, to CS910-ML embedded system. In the same year, DFI also kicked off a full range of product series which were based on Intel 945GSE Chipsets (code name: Navy Pier), covering from NP102-N16C Mini-ITX motherboard, to NP905-B16C COM Express Compact, to NP951-B16C small form factor 3.5" SBC, to ES122-NP embedded system. As of 2009, DFI's capital increased to NTD 1.21 billion. And DFI launched a lineup including PT330-DRM microATX motherboard, PT631-IPM ATX motherboard, and HNVR320-PT embedded system based on Intel Core/Intel Pentium Processors (code name: Piketon). In 2010, DFI's capital increased to NTD 1.202 billion. DFI also launched a product line including CP100-NRM Mini-ITX motherboard, CP330-NRM microATX motherboard, CP908-B COM Express Compact, and ST101-CP embedded system based on Intel Core/Intel Celeron Processors with Mobile Intel QM57 Chipset (code name: Calpella).

DFI also launched system-on-module Qseven, QB700-B + Q7951, which was powered by Intel Atom E600 series processors (code name: Queensbay). In the end of 2010, DFI launched LR100-N18D/S/M Mini-ITX motherboard, LR905-B18D/S/M COM Express, and EC200/210/220/221 embedded system, which were based on

Intel Atom D525/D425 series processors (code name: Luna Pier).

=== 2011–2018 ===
In May 2011, DFI's process-on-order factory in China was transformed into Sole proprietorship, which was capitalized with US$2.5 million. To expand its industrial computer business, DFI established a system engineering department to fulfill highly dedicated researches and design developments for the future. In 2012, DFI launched a product line based on Intel Atom Processor D2550/N2800 (code name: Cedar Trail), including Mini-ITX form factor motherboard CD101-N, COM Express Compact CD905-B, 3.5" SBC motherboard CD951, and embedded system DS910-CD. On June 4, 2014, DFI established Yan Ying Hao Trading Co. Ltd.in ShenZhen, and started to develop business in the China region. To accommodate increasing growth and expansion, DFI relocated its corporate headquarter to Farglory U-Town building in New Taipei City. In 2016, DFI has released Qualcomm-based motherboard and medical industrial computer that dedicate itself to various fields and expand its business with different platforms. DFI has joined Qisda/BenQ Group. In the second half year of 2018, DFI has added the new SMT line to the factory to scale up its facilities and production capability.

== Popular products ==
As of 2012, DFI stopped consumer product line and no longer produced high-end gamer boards such as the LanParty series for end users

== DFI-ACP ==
DFI is also manufacturing motherboards for various industrial purposes. DFI-ACP is a Wintel based platform provider for non-PC business, products range from board level, open frame, add-on boards to barebone systems.
