= Intel High Definition Audio =

Specification for the audio sub-system of personal computers

- Intel High Definition Audio
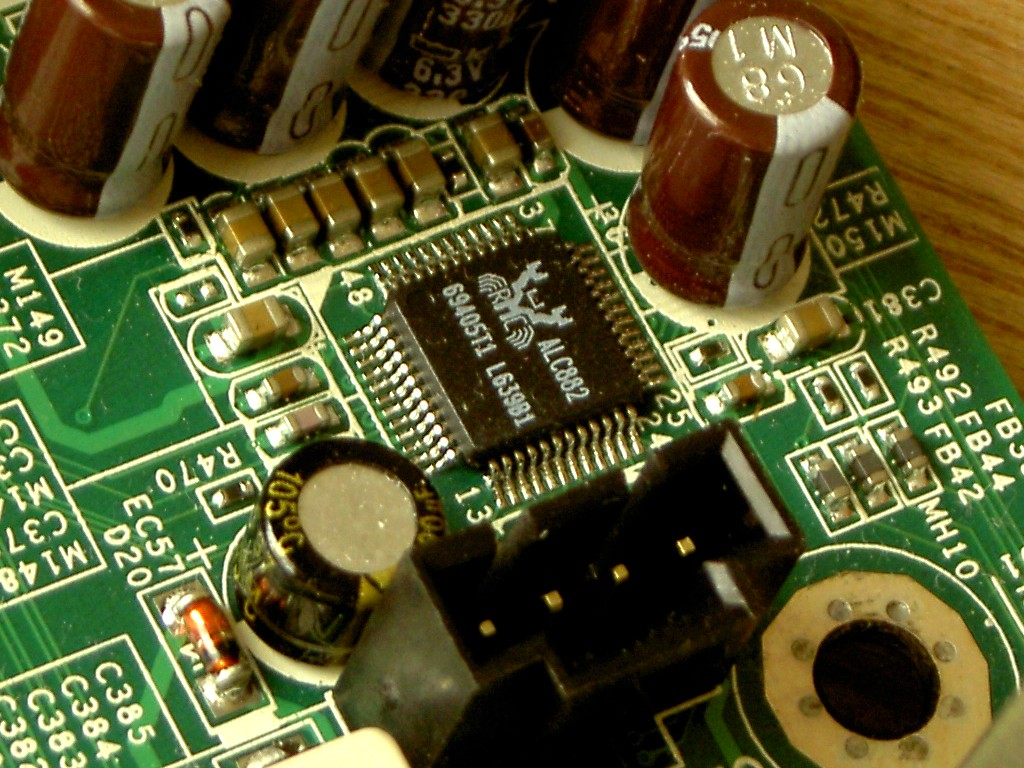
- A Realtek ALC882 high-definition audio codec chip, a common implementation of the standard.
- Abbreviation: Intel HD Audio
- Status: Active
- Year started: 15 April 2004; 22 years ago
- First published: 15 April 2004
- Latest version: 1.0a June 2010
- Organization: Intel
- Authors: Intel (Development codename: Azalia)
- Predecessor: AC'97
- Domain: Computer audio hardware architecture
- License: Proprietary (Intel Specification Developer Agreement)
- Copyright: Intel Corporation
- Website: www.intel.com/content/dam/www/public/us/en/documents/product-specifications/high-definition-audio-specification.pdf

Intel High Definition Audio (IHDA) (also called HD Audio or development codename Azalia) is a specification for the audio sub-system of personal computers. It was released by Intel in 2004 as the successor to their AC'97 PC audio standard, but it is not backwards-compatible with it.

== Features ==
The Intel High Definition Audio specification includes the following features:

- Up to 15 input and 15 output streams
- Up to 16 PCM audio channels per stream
- Sample resolutions of 8, 16, 20, 24 and 32 bits
- Sample rates of 6–192 kHz, and with vendor drivers, up to 384 kHz is possible
- Support for audio codecs (e.g., ADC, DAC, DSP), modem codecs, and vendor-offered codecs
- Discoverable codec architecture
- Fine-grained codec power-control
- Audio jack detection, sensing, and retasking
- Support for digital audio output, such as HDMI and S/PDIF, and the actual DAC operations are happen on digital audio devices such as HDMI-based TVs and monitors
- Vendor-offered (OEM or IHV) audio enhancement features

Motherboards typically do not have any more than eight built-in output channels (7.1 surround sound) and four input channels (back and front panel microphone inputs, and a back-panel stereo line-in). Users requiring more audio I/Os will typically opt for a sound card or an external audio interface, as these provide additional features that are more oriented towards professional audio applications.

== Operating system support ==
The Service Pack 3 update to Windows XP and all later versions of Windows (from Vista onwards) included the Universal Audio Architecture (UAA) class driver, which supported audio devices built to HD Audio's specifications. Retrospective UAA drivers were also built for Windows 2000, Server 2003 and XP Service Pack 1/2. macOS provides support for Intel HD Audio with its AppleHDA driver. Several Linux operating systems also support HD Audio, as well as OpenSolaris, FreeBSD, and OpenBSD. In Microsoft Windows, vendor-offered audio enhancement features usually required vendor drivers.

== Host controller ==
Like AC'97, HD Audio acts as a device driver, defining the architecture, link frame format, and programming interfaces used in the hardware of the host controller of the PCI bus and linking it to a codec used by a computer's software. Configurations of the host controller (Chipset) are available from third-party suppliers, including Creative, Nvidia, VIA and AMD, while codecs have also been provided by third-party suppliers including Realtek, Conexant, Creative, IDT, VIA, SigmaTel, Analog Devices, C-Media and Cirrus Logic. AMD's TRX40 chipset was introduced in 2019 for use with Ryzen "Threadripper" CPUs, which provided no HD Audio interface. As a result, a separate USB audio interface converter, USB codec, or PCIe audio device was required to integrate audio on TRX40 motherboards. Original HD Audio host controller specification was last updated in 2010; This was a temporary measure until a new Audio bus was developed by AMD named Audio CoProcessor (ACP) Bus. Intel has also favored Intel Smart Sound Technology (SST) instead of the more traditional HD Audio Bus. The HD Audio controller / ACP controller / SST controller can include vendor-offered audio enhancement features known as Audio Processing Objects (APOs), offered by companies like Dolby, Creative, Fortemedia, Harman Kardon, Nahimic, Poly Inc, DTS and Waves Audio, they can be software-based and driver-based. The HD Audio codec itself, especially Realtek brand, may also include APOs for audio enhancement features.

== Limitations ==
As with the previous AC'97 standard, HD Audio does not specify handlers for the media buttons attached to headphone jacks (i.e., Play/Pause, Next, Previous, Volume up, Volume down). Similarly, support for USB-C Audio Adapter Accessory Mode (AAAP) is not present.

Some onboard HD Audio controllers would apply some limitations (such as Dynamic Range Compression) by default in BIOS or driver level, as OEM may assume the end-users usually use laptop built-in speaker or use cheap passive multimedia speaker.

HD Audio does not provide asynchronous clock for analog audio; the HD Audio codec clock (BITCLK) is provided by the HD Audio controller.

== Front panel connector ==
Computer motherboards often provide a connector to bring microphone and headphone signals to the computer's front panel. Intel provides a general specification for this process, but the signal assignments are different for both AC'97 and HD Audio headers.

The pin assignments for the AC'97 and HD Audio connectors are:

Pin	AC'97		HD Audio (HDA)	
Pin	Signal	Description	Signal	Description
1	MIC	Audio, mono, in (mic. level); Audio, left, in (biased, mic.level)	PORT 1L	Audio, left, port 1
2	AUD_GND	Ground	GND	Ground
3	MIC BIAS	Microphone bias; Audio, right, in (biased, mic. level)	PORT 1R	Audio, right, port 1
4	AUD_GND	Ground	PRESENCE#	HDA dongle/connector detection, active low
5	FP_OUT_R	Audio out, right, out (headphone-level capable), front panel	PORT 2R	Audio, right, port 2
6	FP_RETURN_R	Audio, right, return (when jack is unconnected), front panel	SENSE1_RETURN	Port 1 jack detection
7	AUD_5V	Power, +5 V	SENSE_SEND	Jack detection sense, resistance multiplexed
8	KEY	Not present, physical key	KEY	Not present, physical key
9	FP_OUT_L	Audio, left, out (headphone-level capable), front panel	PORT 2L	Audio, left, port 2
10	FP_RETURN_L	Audio, left, return (when jack is unconnected), front panel	SENSE2_RETURN	Port 2 jack detection

The HD Audio 3.5 mm subminiature audio jack differed from connectors used in the AC'97 specification and in general audio equipment. The AC'97 used a regular 3.5 mm audio jack, which typically has 5 pins: one pin for ground, two pins for stereo signal, and two pins for the return signal. When no plug is connected, the two stereo signals are connected to their return pins. When a plug is inserted, the stereo signals contact the respective channels on the plug and are disconnected from the jack's return pins. The HD Audio 3.5 mm jack does not have the two return audio signals; instead, it has an isolated switch that senses the presence of a plug in the jack.

In the AC'97 design, the audio output is sent to the jack by default. When a headphone is detected, the return signal pins for the speakers are disconnected, directing the audio to the headphone. The jack redirects the audio to the speakers if no headphone connection is detected. Similarly, the return pins ground the microphone jack connection if no microphone detected. As a result, most motherboards with AC'97 audio require two jumpers to short these pins if no front panel audio module is connected, so audio passes to the speakers.

In the HD Audio design, the codec sends the audio directly to the speakers if a plug is not inserted. When a plug is inserted, the isolated switch inside the jack informs the motherboard, and the codec sends audio to the headphones. A similar isolated switch is used to detect when a microphone has been plugged in. HD Audio can also sense the presence of an audio dongle. A 10 kΩ pull-up resistor is attached to pin 4 (PRESENCE#). When the HDA dongle is plugged in, it pulls pin 4 to the ground with a 1 kΩ resistor. The motherboard can determine if a dongle is connected by examining the logic level on pin 4. If the motherboard does not detect a HDA dongle, it should ignore the SENSE1_RETURN (pin 6) and SENSE2_RETURN (pin 10) signals.

Intel warns that HDA dongles should be used with HDA motherboards:

It is strongly recommended that motherboard designers only use Intel HD Audio analog front panel dongles with the Intel HD Audio analog front panel header to ensure that the jack detection and dynamic retasking capability are preserved. Passive AC'97 analog front panel dongles (ones that leave the 5V Analog pin-7 line unconnected on the dongle) may be used with the Intel HD Audio analog front panel header. But note that the front panel jack detection and re-tasking functionality will be lost as the AC'97 jacks cannot support connection to the SENSE line. In addition, software must be aware that an AC'97 dongle is being used with an Intel HD Audio analog header since the software might need to dedicate codec ports that are connected to the header to meet the product's intended functionality.

The different signal assignments can cause trouble when AC'97 front-panel dongles are used with HDA motherboards and vice versa. An AC'97 dongle returns audio on pins 6 and 10 rather than digital plug sensing signals. Consequently, a loud audio passage may cause a HDA motherboard with a AC'97 dongle believe headphones and microphones are being plugged and unplugged hundreds of times per second. An AC'97 motherboard with an HDA dongle will route the AC'97 5 V audio supply (pin 7; silence) to the speakers instead of the desired left and right audio signals. To avoid this, some motherboards allow choosing between HDA and AC'97 front panels in the BIOS. Even though the actual audio hardware is HD Audio, the BIOS can be manipulated to allow the use of an AC'97 front panel. Likewise, some modern enclosures have both an "AC'97" and an "HDA" plug at the end of the front-panel audio cable.

== See also ==
- Sound chip
