= Air bearing =

Bearings with pressurized gas for low friction

Air bearings (also known as aerostatic or aerodynamic bearings) are bearings that use a thin film of pressurized gas to provide a low friction load-bearing interface between surfaces. The two surfaces do not touch, thus avoiding the problems of friction, wear, particulates, and lubricant handling associated with conventional bearings, and air bearings offer distinct advantages in precision positioning, such as lacking backlash and static friction, as well as in high-speed applications. Spacecraft simulators now most often use air bearings, and 3D printers are now used to make air-bearing–based attitude simulators for CubeSat satellites.

A differentiation is made between aerodynamic bearings, which establish the air cushion through the relative motion between static and moving parts, and aerostatic bearings, in which the pressure is being externally inserted.

Gas bearings are mainly used in precision machinery tools (measuring and processing machines) and high-speed machines (spindle, small-scale turbomachinery, precision gyroscopes).

Air borne high frequency spindle with integrated feeding

== Gas bearing types ==
Gas-lubricated bearings are classified in two groups, depending on the source of pressurization of the gas film providing the load-carrying capacity:

- Aerostatic bearings: The gas is externally pressurized (using a compressor or a pressure tank) and injected in the clearance of the bearing. Consequently, aerostatic bearings can sustain loads even in the absence of relative motion but require an external gas compression system, which induces costs in terms of complexity and energy.
- Aerodynamic bearings: The gas is pressurized by the relative velocity between the static and moving surfaces in the bearing. Such bearings are self-acting and do not require an external input of compressed gas. However, mechanical contact occurs at zero speed, requiring a particular tribological consideration to avoid premature wear.

Hybrid bearings combining the two families also exist. In such cases, a bearing is typically fed with externally-compressed gas at low speed and then relies partially or entirely on the self-pressurizing effect at higher speeds.

Among these two technological categories, gas bearings are classified depending on the kind of linkage they realize:

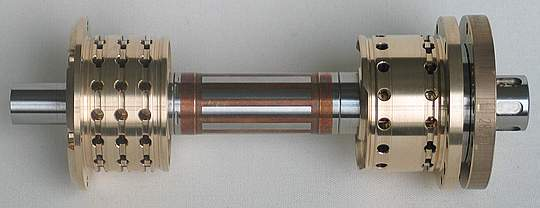
Air-borne high-frequency spindle

- Linear-motion bearings support translation along one or more axes between two planes.
- Journal bearings support a rotation between two parts.
- Thrust bearings block the axial displacement of a rotating part. These are usually used in combination with journal bearings.

The main types of air bearing fall under the following categories:

Gas bearing type	Technology	Description
Aerostatic	Porous media	Gas flow is controlled through porous material
Aerostatic	Micro-nozzle	Gas flow is controlled through micro-sized holes
Aerostatic	Orifice type	Gas flow is controlled through holes and grooves
Aerostatic	Air caster	Gas flow is controlled through an air bag
Aerodynamic	Foil bearing	Bearing surface is flexible, allowing large displacement and providing a good stability.
Aerodynamic	Spiral groove bearing	Gas film is pressurized by grooves machined on one of the surfaces, achieving high load capacity and stability. The usual groove patterns are herringbone-shaped, spiral or straight (step bearings)

=== Aerostatic bearings ===
Pressurized gas acts as a lubricant in the gap between moving parts. The gas cushion carries the load without any contact between the moving parts. Normally, the compressed gas is supplied by a compressor. A key goal of supplying the gas pressure in the gap is that the stiffness and damping of the gas cushion reaches the highest possible level. In addition, gas consumption and uniformity of gas supply into the gap are crucial for the behaviors of aerostatic bearings.

==== Delivery of gas to the gap ====
Supplying gas to the interface between moving elements of an aerostatic bearing can be achieved in a few different methods:

- Porous Surface
- Partial porous surface
- Discrete orifice feeding
- Slot feeding
- Groove feeding

There is no single best approach to feeding the film. All methods have their advantages and disadvantages specific to each application.

==== Dead volume ====
Dead volume refers to chambers and canals in conventional aerostatic bearings, as well as the cavities within porous (sintered) materials, that exist to distribute the gas and increase the pressure within the gap.

==== Conventional aerostatic bearings ====
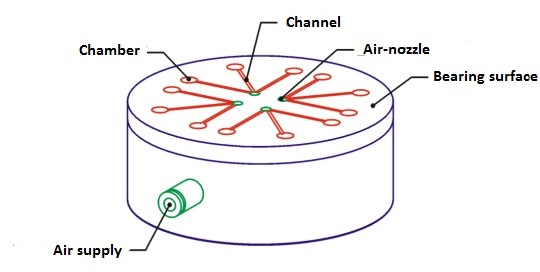
Nozzle-air bearing with chambers and channels

With conventional single-nozzle aerostatic bearings, the compressed air flows through a few relatively large nozzles (diameter 0.1 – 0.5 mm) into the bearing gap. The gas consumption thus allows only some flexibility such that the bearing's features (force, moments, bearing surface, bearing gap height, damping) can be adjusted only insufficiently. However, in order to allow a uniform gas pressure even with few nozzles, aerostatic bearing manufacturers take constructive techniques. In doing so, these bearings cause dead volumes (non-compressible and thus weak air volume). In effect, this dead volume is very harmful for the gas bearing's dynamic and causes self-excited vibrations.

==== Single-nozzle aerostatic bearings ====
The pre-pressured chamber consists of a chamber around the centralized nozzle. Usually, this chamber's ratio is between 3% and 20% of the bearing's surface. Even with a chamber depth of 1/100 mm, the dead volume is very high. In the worst cases, these air bearings consist of a concave bearing surface instead of a chamber. Disadvantages of these air bearings include a very poor tilt stiffness.

==== Gas bearings with channels and chambers ====
Typically, conventional aerostatic bearings are implemented with chambers and canals. This design assumes that with a limited amount of nozzles, the dead volume should decrease while distributing the gas within the gap uniformly. Most constructive ideas refer to special canal structures. Since the late 1980s, aerostatic bearings with micro-canal structures without chambers are manufactured. However, this technique also has to manage problems with dead volume. With an increasing gap height, the micro-canal's load and stiffness decreases. As in the case of high-speed linear drives or high-frequency spindles, this may cause serious disadvantages.

==== Laser-drilled micro-nozzle aerostatic bearings ====
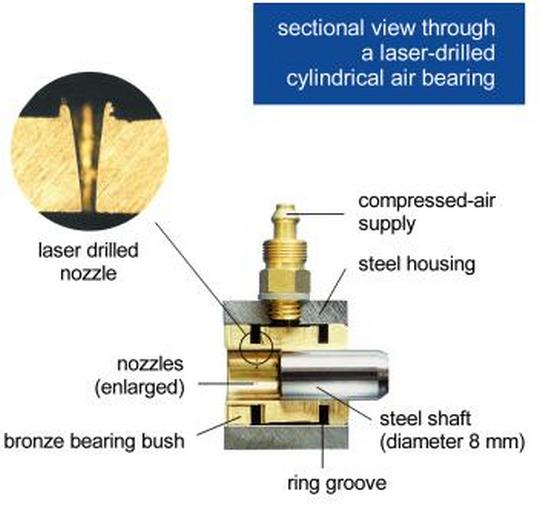
Cross-section of a cylindrical element

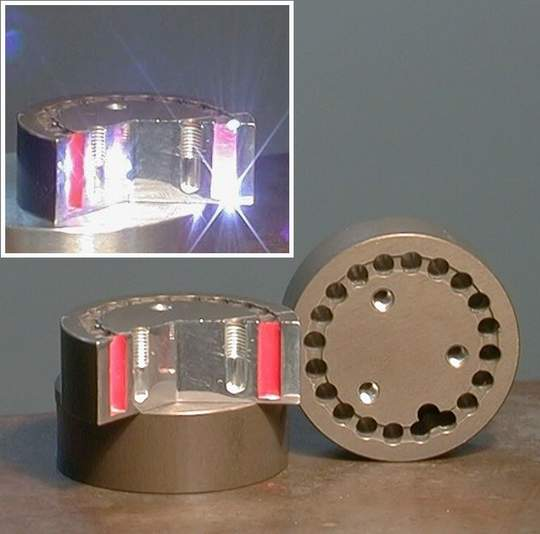
Laser processing (cut through a bearing element)

Laser-drilled micro-nozzle aerostatic bearings make use of computerized manufacturing and design techniques to optimize performance and efficiency. This technology allows manufacturers more flexibility in manufacturing. In turn this allows a larger design envelope in which to optimize their designs for a given application. In many cases engineers can create air bearings that approach the theoretical limit of performance. Rather than a few large nozzles, aerostatic bearings with many micro-nozzles avoid dynamically disadvantageous dead volumes. Dead volumes refer to all cavities in which gas cannot be compressed during decrease of the gap. These appear as weak gas pressure stimulates vibration. Examples of the benefits are: linear drives with accelerations of more than 1,000 m/s^{2} (100 g), or impact drives with even more than 100,000 m/s^{2} (10,000 g) due to high damping in combination with dynamic stiffness; sub-nanometer movements due to lowest noise-induced errors; and seal-free transmission of gas or vacuum for rotary and linear drives via the gap due to guided air supply.

Micro-nozzle aerostatic bearings achieve an effective, nearly perfect pressure distribution within the gap with a large number of micro-nozzles. Their typical diameter is between 0.02 mm and 0.06 mm. The narrowest cross-section of these nozzles lies exactly at the bearing's surface. Thereby the technology avoids a dead volume on the supporting air bearing's surface and within the area of the air supplying nozzles.

The micro-nozzles are automatically drilled with a laser beam that provides top-quality and repeatability. The physical behaviors of the air bearings prove to have a low variation for large as well as for small production volumes. In contrast to conventional bearings, with this technique the air bearings require no manual or costly manufacturing.

The advantages of the micro-nozzle air bearing technology include:

- Efficient use of the air cushion (close to the physical limit) through a uniform pressure within the whole gap;
- Perfect combination of static and dynamic properties;
- Highest-possible flexibility of the air bearing properties: with a particular gap height, it is possible to optimize the air bearing such that it has, for example, a maximum load, stiffness, tilt stiffness, damping, or a minimum air consumption (respectively also in combination with others);
- Multi-approved highest precision of all air bearings, e.g. in the measurement technology due to slightest movements (<< 2 nanometer) through physical, lowest-possible self-excited vibrations;
- Considerably higher tilt stiffness than conventional air bearings such that the air within the gap flows through canals from the loaded to the unloaded areas away;
- Vibration-free within the entire operating range even with high air pressure supply (actually even much more than 10 bar are possible);
- Highest reliability due to the large number of nozzles: clogging of nozzles by particles is out of question (no failure in operation) because their diameters are much higher than the gap height;
- Possibility to adjust bearing properties for deformation and tolerances of the bearing and opposite surface;
- Proven usability for many bearing materials and coatings.

Some of these advantages, such as the high flexibility, the excellent static and dynamic properties in combination, and a low noise excitation, prove to be unique among all other aerostatic bearings.

==== Various designs ====
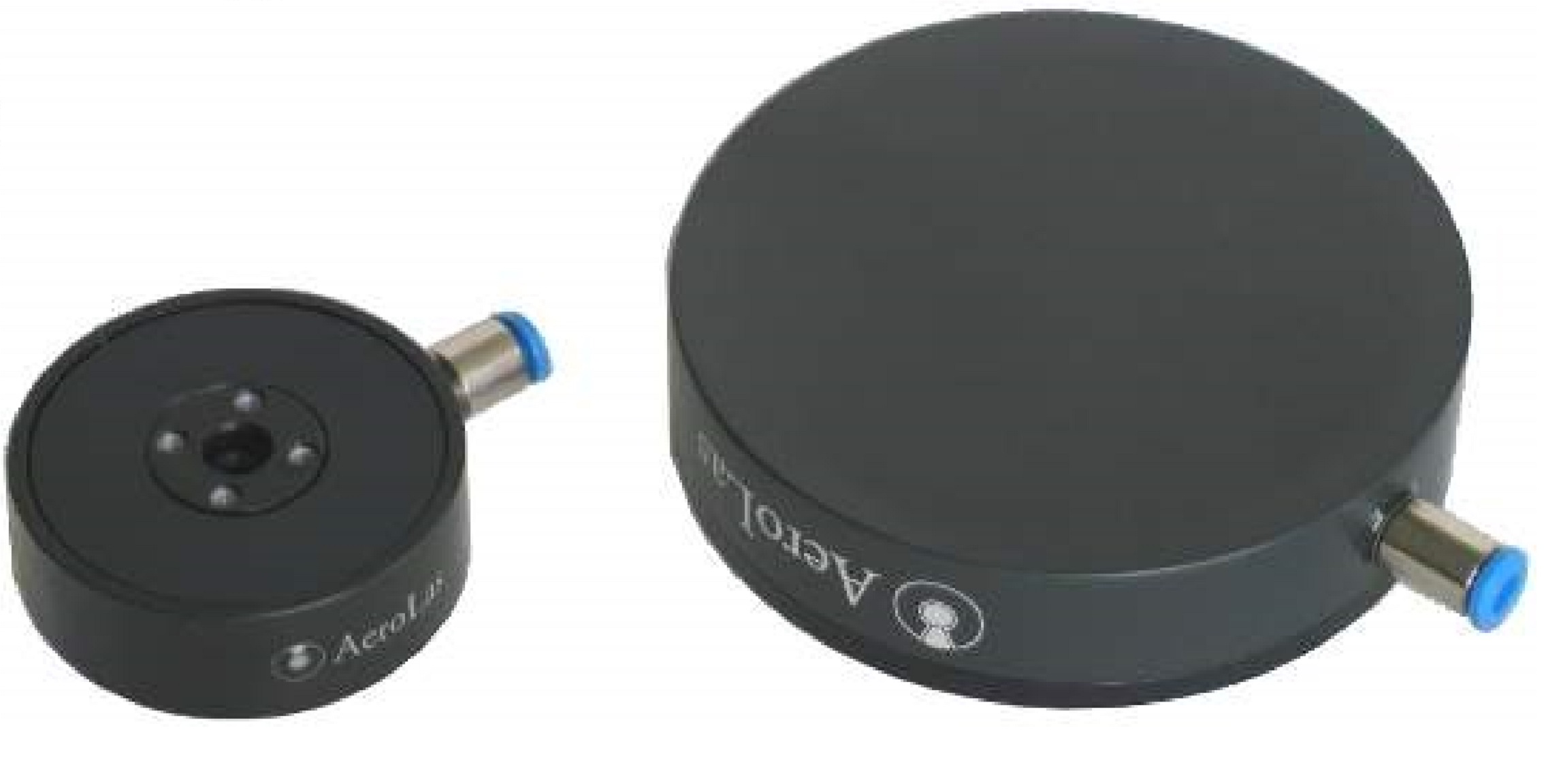
Standard bearing round

Standard air bearings are offered with various mountings to link them in a system:

- Bearings for flexible connection with ball-pins. This design for standard air bearings is usually supplied on the market.
- Bearings with a high-stiff joint instead of a conventional ball-pin. Using this version the stiffness of the complete system is significantly higher.
- Bearings with integrated piston for preload of statically determined guidances.
- In addition, there are also rectangular bearings with a fixed mounting (joint-less) for guidances with highest stiffness for highest accuracy or highest dynamic.
- Furthermore, there are also air bearings with integrated vacuum or magnetic preloads, air bearings for high temperatures with more than 400 °C, as well as ones manufactured with alternative materials.

== Advantages and disadvantages of gas-lubricated bearings ==
=== Advantages ===
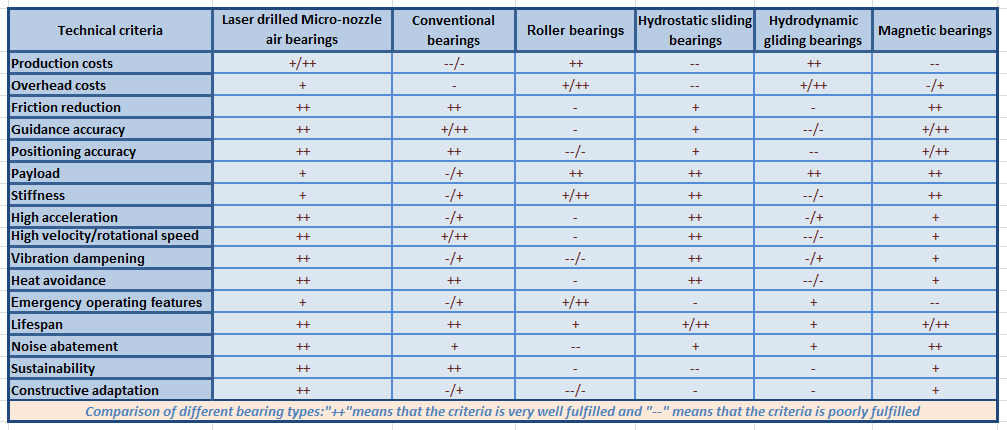
Comparison of bearings

- Wearless operation, durability. Air bearings operate contact-free and so without abrasion. The only friction results from airflow between the bearing surfaces. Thus, the durability of air bearings is unlimited if they are designed and calculated correctly. Roller bearings and friction bearings have a high degree of friction when used at high speed or acceleration, causing a positive feedback loop where high abrasion decreases precision, which in turn causes greater wear, leading to their eventual failure.
- Guiding, repeatability, and position accuracy. In the chip production and when positioning at the back-end, repeatability accuracy of 1-2 μm must be reached with the wire bonder. At the die bonder, even 5 μm must be achieved. With such a precision, roller bearings reach their physical limit without a lower acceleration. At the front end (lithography), air bearings are already established.
- Cost advantage and repeatability. When applied in series, gas bearings can have a cost advantage over roller bearings: the production of a roller-guided high-frequency spindle is – according to a manufacturer – about 20% more expensive than air-guided spindles.
- Environmental purity. Because they do not require the use of oil for their lubrication and are frictionless, gas bearings are suited for applications requiring a low contamination of the working fluid. This is a critical aspect to the pharmaceutical industry, nuclear fuel processing, semi-conductor manufacturing and energy conversion cycles.

=== Disadvantages ===
- Self-excited vibration. In journal bearings, self-excited vibration can appear past a given speed, because of the cross-coupled stiffness and low damping of gas lubrication. This vibration can lead to an instability and threaten the gas bearing operation. Precise dynamic computations are required to ensure a safe operation within the desired speed range. This kind of instability is known as "half-speed whirl" and affects particularly aerodynamic bearings.
- Tight manufacturing tolerances. In order to carry sufficient load and avoid the instability mentioned above, tight tolerances are required in the clearance between bearing surfaces. Typical clearances ranging from 5 μm to 50 μm are required for both aerodynamic and aerostatic bearings. Consequently, air bearings are expensive to manufacture.
- Clean environment. Because of their small clearance, gas-lubricated bearings are sensitive to the presence of particulates and dust in the environment (in the case of aerodynamic bearings) and externally-pressurized gas (aerostatic bearings).

== Theoretical modeling ==
Gas-lubricated bearings are usually modeled using the Reynolds equation to describe the evolution of pressure in the thin film domain. Unlike liquid-lubricated bearings, the gas lubricant has to be considered as compressible, leading to a non-linear differential equation to be solved. Numerical methods such as Finite difference method or Finite element method are common for the discretization and the resolution of the equation, accounting for the boundary conditions associated to each bearing geometry (linear-motion, journal and thrust bearings). In most cases, the gas film can be considered as isothermal and respecting the ideal gas law, leading to a simplification of the Reynolds equation.

== Examples ==
=== Automotive technology ===
Air bearing cutting engine

Air bearing Doppler engine

Air bearing two-axis table with friction drive

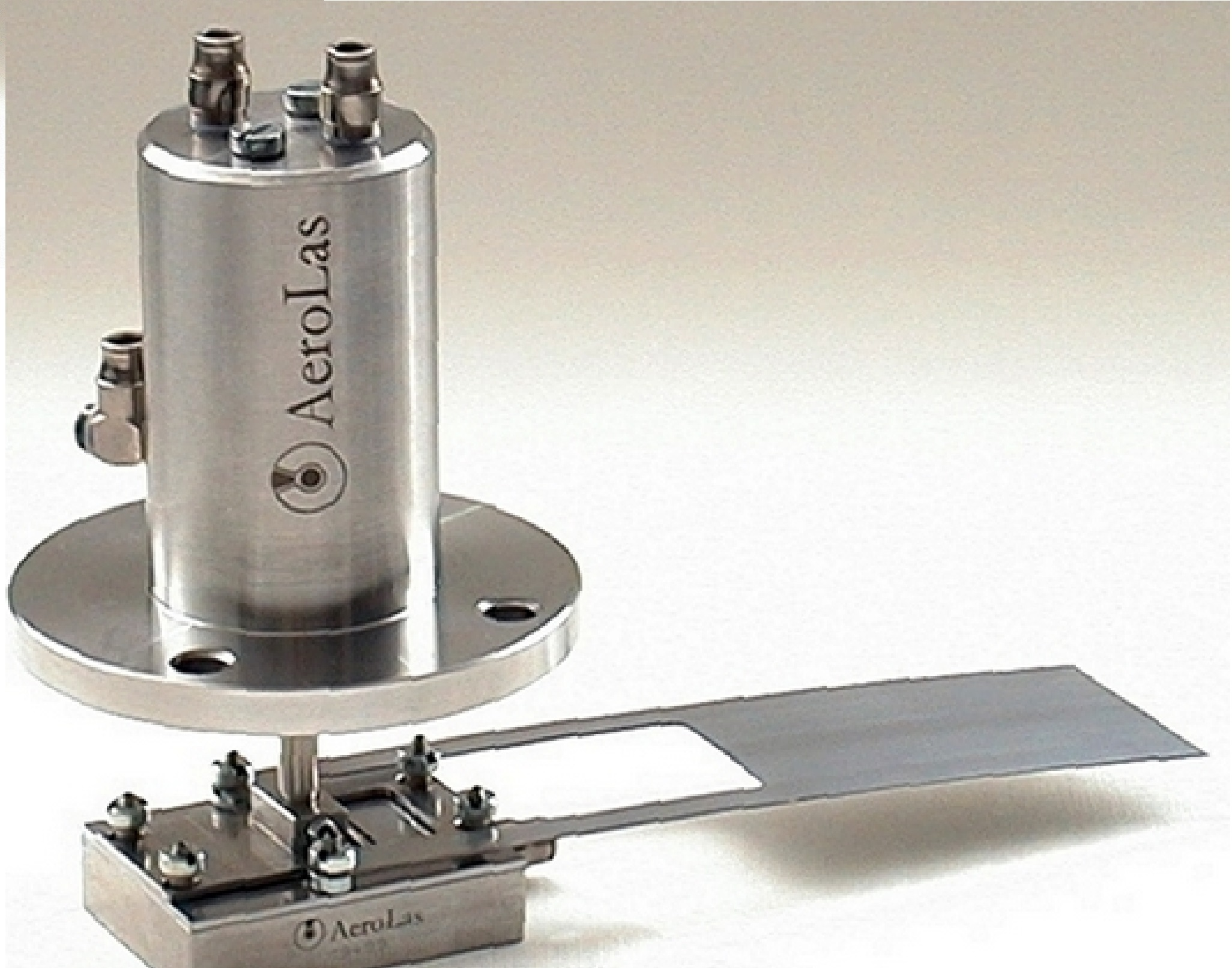
Bearing with piston actor

Air bearing satellite system for solar arrays

Air-guided high-frequency knife drive
Even for movements which cause damage due to disruptive wear with roller bearings, lifetimes of the drive systems are unlimited.
Air-guided turbo charger
In order to provide confidence and for the first investigations, an initial conversion from a conventional oil-guided turbo charger into air-guided was done. For a real future version, the use of results obtained from high-temperature solutions, mass products (proved production costs) and high-frequency spindles (know-how of dynamic background) will be very helpful.

=== Semiconductor technology ===
Air bearing for inspection device
In terms of the measurement of wafers and flat panels, it is very important to place the sensor chip precisely and without any contact along the surface. Therefore, the chip is integrated directly into the bearing's surface. The maximum distance tolerance to the surface which refers to the gap variation of the air bearing, is smaller than 0.5 μm. When placing the air bearing with the sensor chip, they must not touch the wafer surface being measured. As for the up-and-down movement, a pneumatic piston is used which is, for repeatability reasons, also air-guided. The preload of the air bearing and thus the gap height are also adjusted with this piston.
Chuck with integrated lift drive
For the electrical testing of wafers the chuck can be lifted stick-slip-free up to 3 mm. The needed contact force for the probe is adjustable and independent from stroke. The lift drive is based on a voice coil motor; the guidance is air-guided. An air-guided pneumatic piston between the chuck and the drive limits the contact force.

=== Linear drives ===
Precision measurement stage
The filigree structure enables through light measurements for the 300 nm chip production with the utmost precision of less than 1 nm. In particular, the air bearings are designed for lowest air consumption with the highest stiffness.
High-accelerated Doppler drive
The High-accelerated Doppler drive supports and guides a carbon fiber mirror (surface 500 mm × 250 mm) with an acceleration of up to 300 m/s^{2} and a flexible movement profile with high precision. The solution consists of an air-guided drive: The beam (length 900 mm), which is fixed at the mirror, is manufactured of carbon fibre and carries the magnets of the linear motors. Cables/tubes (motor, air bearing, measurement system) do not move in order to avoid breakages due to high load cycles. The air-bearings are absolutely insensitive against geometric fluctuation as a result of a temperature change.
Drive for production machine
Beside the performance, the reliability is extremely important for a production machine. The air-guided solution is designed to be statically determined. The iron-core linear motor and piston bearings achieve the preload for the air bearings. Thereby, the drive is easy to assemble and insensitive against geometric variations, for instance through temperature influences or the disposition of the machines.

=== Medical technology ===
Fat- and oil-free drives for respirators, stick-slip-free movements of scanners or a high rotary speed of large rotors have all been achieved with air bearings.

Air-guided computed tomography
High rotary speed (> 5.5 Hz / 330 rpm), low operation costs, no noise, large inner rotor diameter (> 1 m), small weight of rotor and frame, tilt possibility of the rotor as well as a high reliability. Besides a direct drive, a belt drive is also possible.

=== Production technology ===
Primarily, stick-slip-free movements and/or smallest forces are required. The air bearing technology is predestinated for fat/oil-free high-dynamic movements with short strokes.

Air bearing for the adjustment of components
With air-guided units, optical components can be arranged to have the same diameter on a rotary table. The air bearing with vacuum preload and a constant bearing gap height floats contact-less on top of the rotary table.
Adjustment slider for optics production
The linear slider, which is air-guided and statically determined, guarantees a high-precision positioning of the optical component before grinding. The self-aligning process is done without friction or force. When clamped the component retains its position for further manufacturing in the sub-micrometer-range.

=== Space technology ===
Air-magnetic slip system
When transporting solar panels for satellites in a launching rocket, these must be folded. After reaching orbit, they unfold via a spring mechanism, weightlessly and without friction. This process requires prior testing on Earth to confirm their reliability. During the testing design, the solar panels are hung on magnetic preloaded air-bearings that compensate for gravity. In doing so, the unfolding movement process is carried out with a minimum friction impact which means that the solar panels are tested at close to reality. Moreover, the design offers absolutely maintenance-free handling with equal sequential movements. The air-bearing components (diameter 34 mm) with integrated magnets are so small such that they are able to glide contact-free along conventional rolled sheet plates smoothly and with a bearing gap height of about 25 μm. The holding force of an air bearing for one solar panel averages 600 N. This force is achieved by an equal distribution of the load on 16 single air bearing elements. The unfolding process of the solar panels has been developed for an area of 21 m x 2.5 m. The permanent magnetic preloaded air-bearing guidance system may be used for many types of hanging transportation movements as well as for many other applications, such as for instance for the stick-slip-free positioning of components during assembly.
