= Computer fan =

Miniature fan used in a computer for active cooling

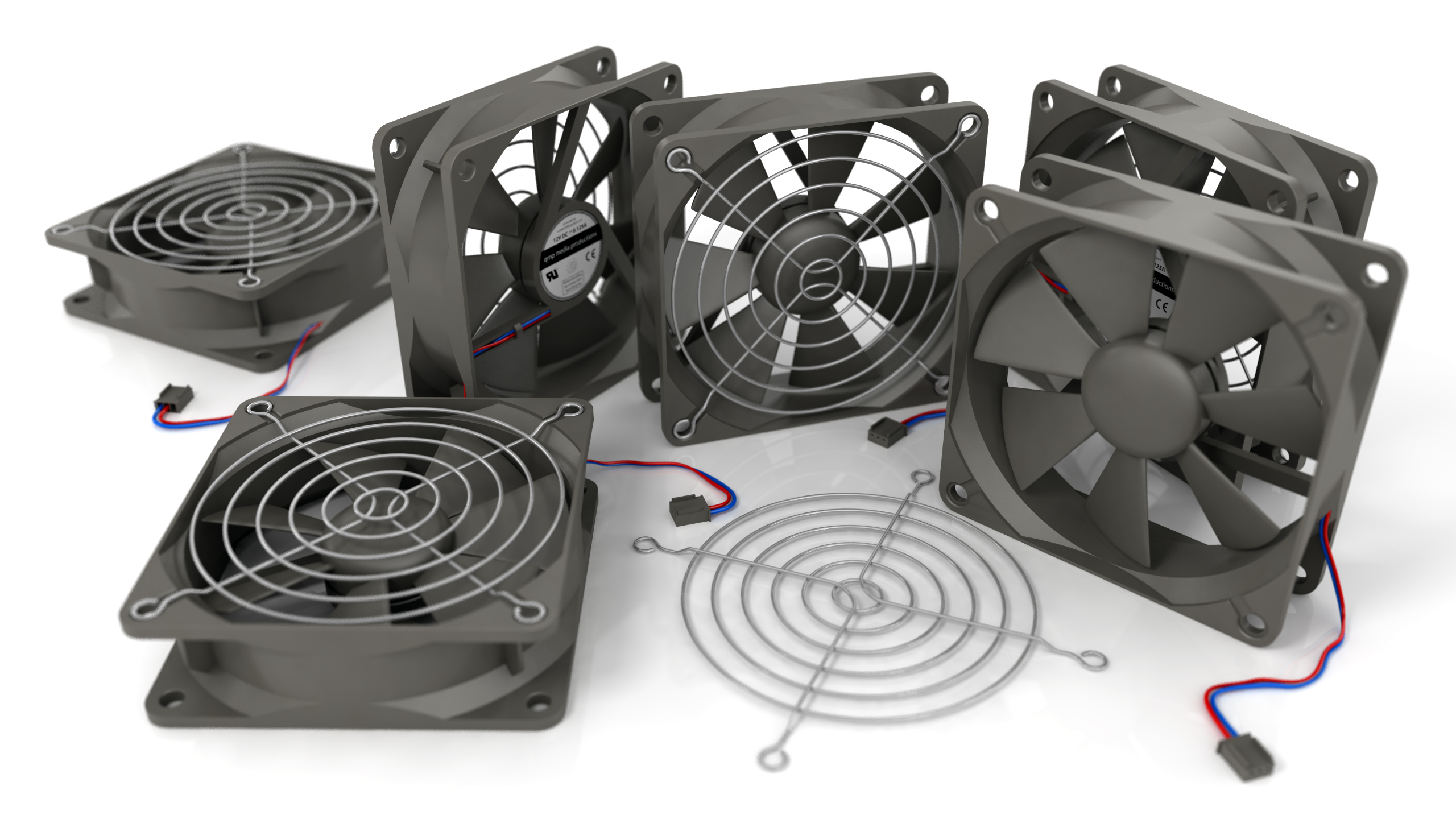
Six 80 mm fans, commonplace components in earlier personal computers (either as a pair or mixed with fans of other sizes)

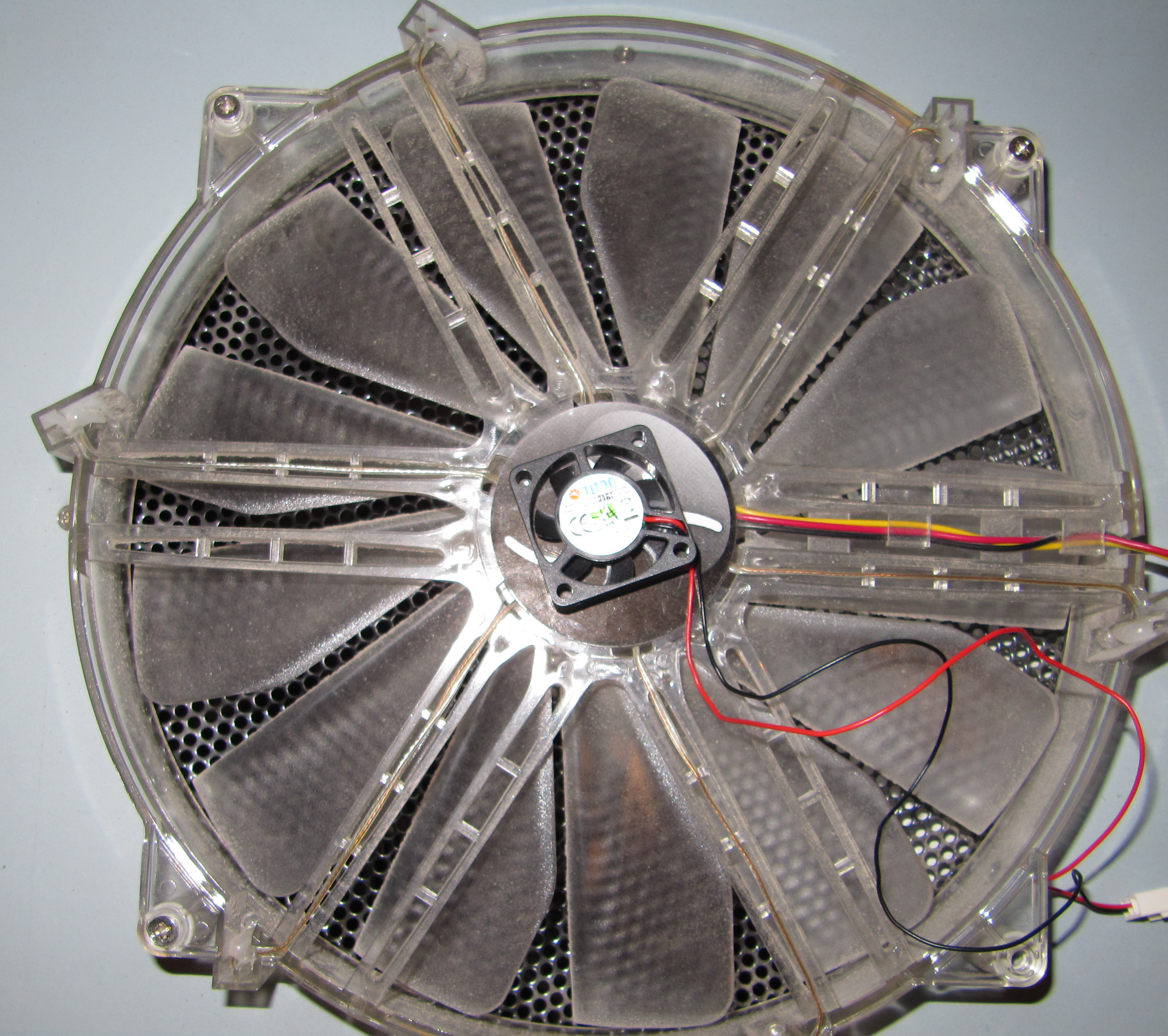
A 30-millimetre (1.2 in) PC fan in a square black plastic chassis lying on the hub of a circular one of translucent plastic sized 250 mm (9.8 in)

A computer fan is any fan inside, or attached to, a computer case used for active cooling. Fans are used to draw cooler air into the case from the outside, expel warm air from inside and move air across a heat sink to cool a particular component. Both axial and sometimes centrifugal (blower/squirrel-cage) fans are used in computers. Computer fans commonly come in standard sizes, such as 92 mm, 120 mm (most common), 140 mm, and even 200–220 mm. They are powered and controlled using 3-pin or 4-pin fan connectors.

== Usage ==
While in earlier personal computers it was possible to cool most components using natural convection (passive cooling), many modern components require more effective active cooling. To cool these components, fans are used to move heated air away from the components and draw cooler air over them. Fans attached to components are usually used in combination with a heat sink to increase the area of heated surface in contact with the air, thereby improving the efficiency of cooling. Fan control is not always an automatic process. A computer's BIOS can control the speed of the built-in fan system for the computer. A user can even supplement this function with additional cooling components or connect a manual fan controller with knobs that set fans to different speeds.

In the IBM PC compatible market, the computer's power supply unit (PSU) almost always uses an exhaust fan to expel warm air from the PSU. Active cooling on CPUs started to appear on the Intel 80486, and by 1997 was standard on all desktop processors. Chassis or case fans, usually one exhaust fan to expel heated air from the rear and optionally an intake fan to draw cooler air in through the front, became common with the arrival of the Pentium 4 in late 2000.

== Applications ==
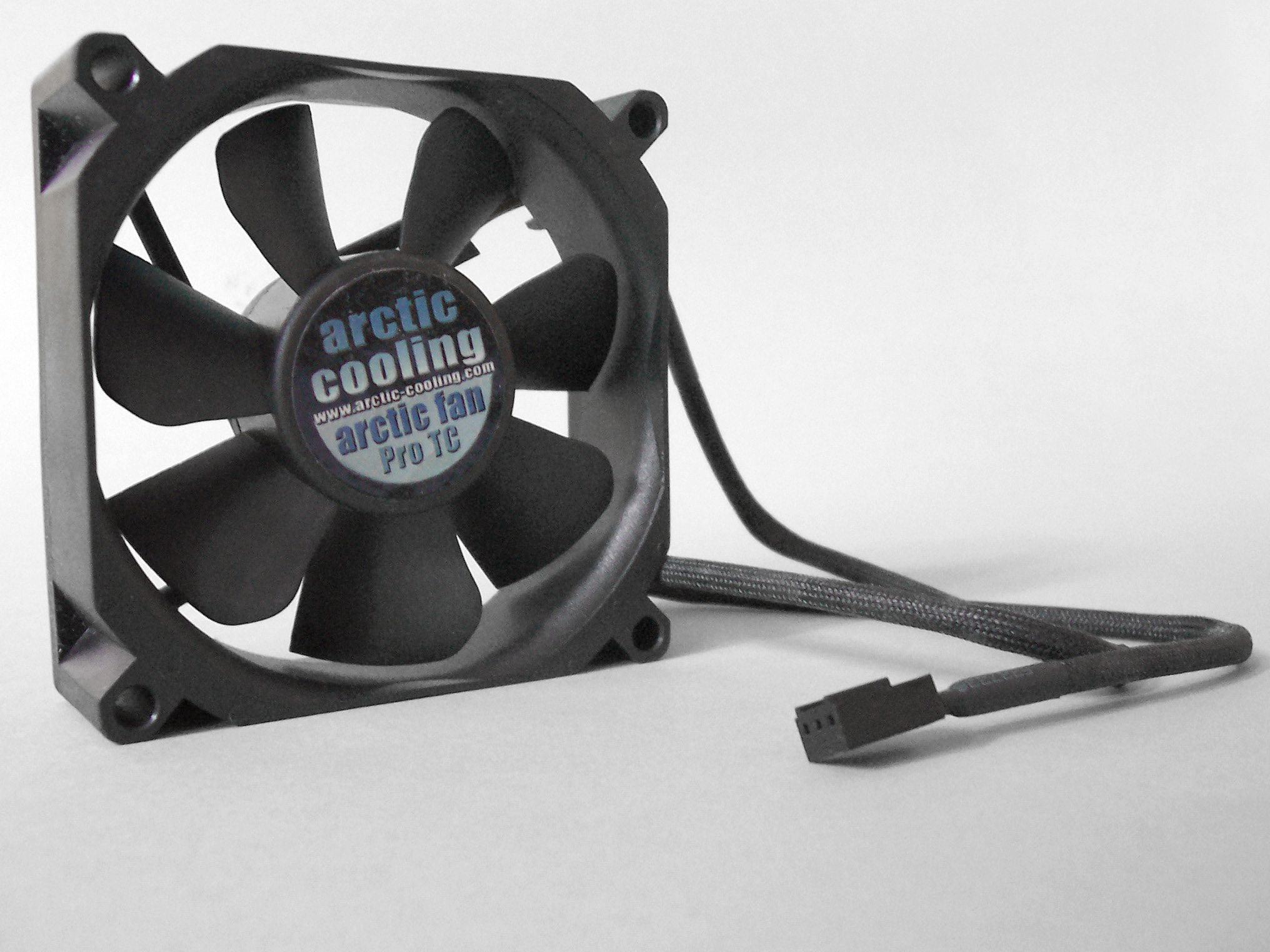
An 80 mm × 80 mm × 25 mm axial computer fan

=== Case fan ===
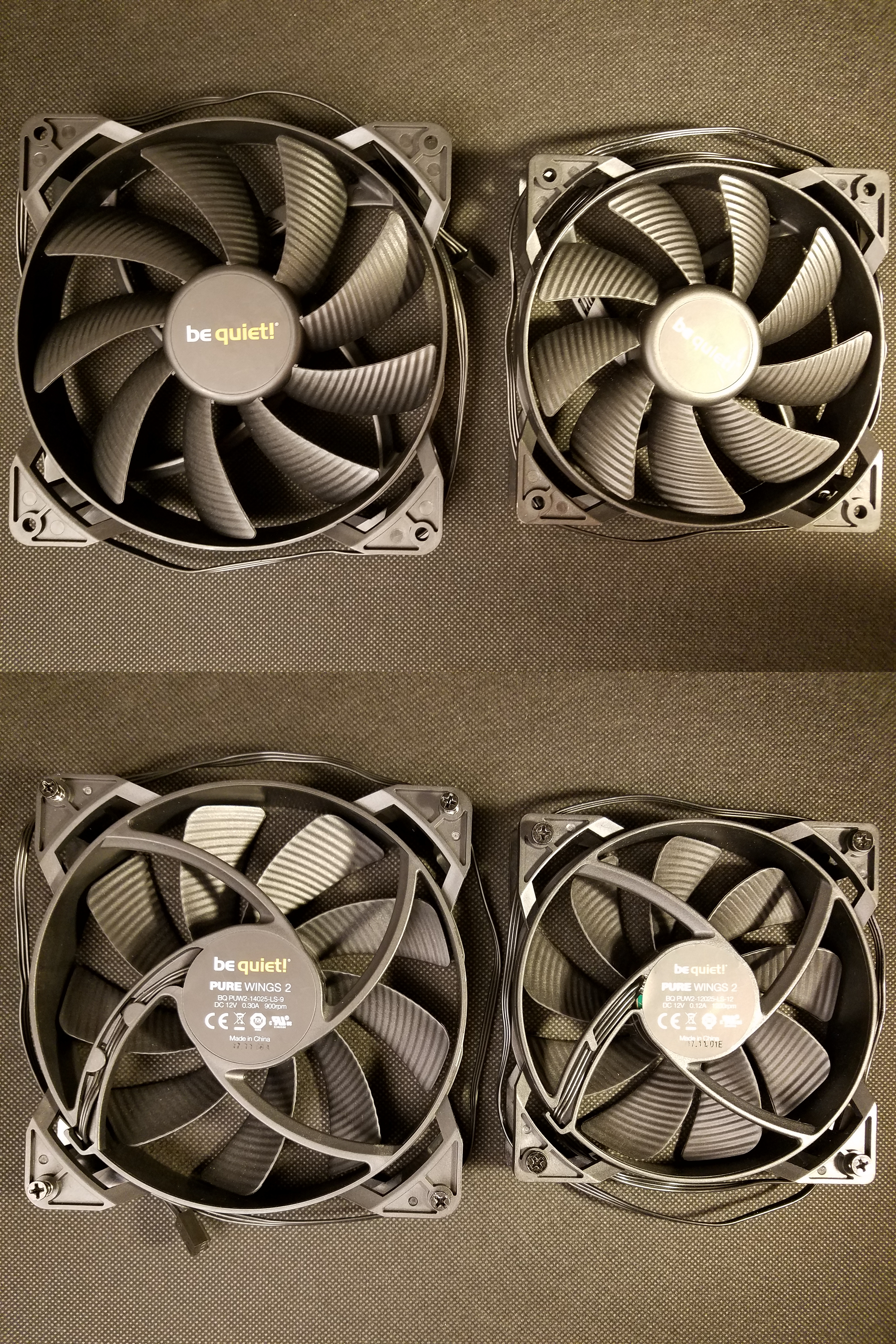
Fans from computer case – front and back

Fans are used to move air through the computer case. The components inside the case cannot dissipate heat efficiently if the surrounding air is too hot. Case fans may be placed as intake fans, drawing cooler outside air in through the front or bottom of the chassis (where it may also be drawn over the internal hard drive racks), or exhaust fans, expelling warm air through the top or rear. Some ATX tower cases have one or more additional vents and mounting points in the left side panel where one or more fans may be installed to blow cool air directly onto the motherboard components and expansion cards, which are among the largest heat sources.

Standard axial case fans are 40, 60, 80, 92, 120, 140, 200 and 220 mm in width and length. As case fans are often the most readily visible form of cooling on a PC, decorative fans are widely available and may be lit with LEDs, made of UV-reactive plastic, or covered with decorative grilles. Decorative fans and accessories are popular with case modders. Air filters are often used over intake fans, to prevent dust from entering the case and clogging up the internal components. Heatsinks are especially vulnerable to being clogged up, as the insulating effect of the dust will rapidly degrade the heatsink's ability to dissipate heat.

=== PSU fan ===
While the power supply (PSU) contains a fan with few exceptions, it is not to be used for case ventilation. The hotter the PSU's intake air is, the hotter the PSU gets. As the PSU temperature rises, the conductivity of its internal components decrease. Decreased conductivity means that the PSU will convert more of the input electric energy into thermal energy (heat). This cycle of increasing temperature and decreased efficiency continues until the PSU either overheats, or its cooling fan is spinning fast enough to keep the PSU adequately supplied with comparatively cool air. The PSU is mainly bottom-mounted in modern PCs, having its own dedicated intake and exhaust vents, preferably with a dust filter in its intake vent.

=== CPU fan ===
CPU fan Thermalright Le Grand Macho RT functioning

Used to cool the CPU (central processing unit) heatsink. Effective cooling of a concentrated heat source such as a large-scale integrated circuit requires a heatsink, which may be cooled by a fan; use of a fan alone will not prevent overheating of the small chip.

=== Graphics-card fan ===
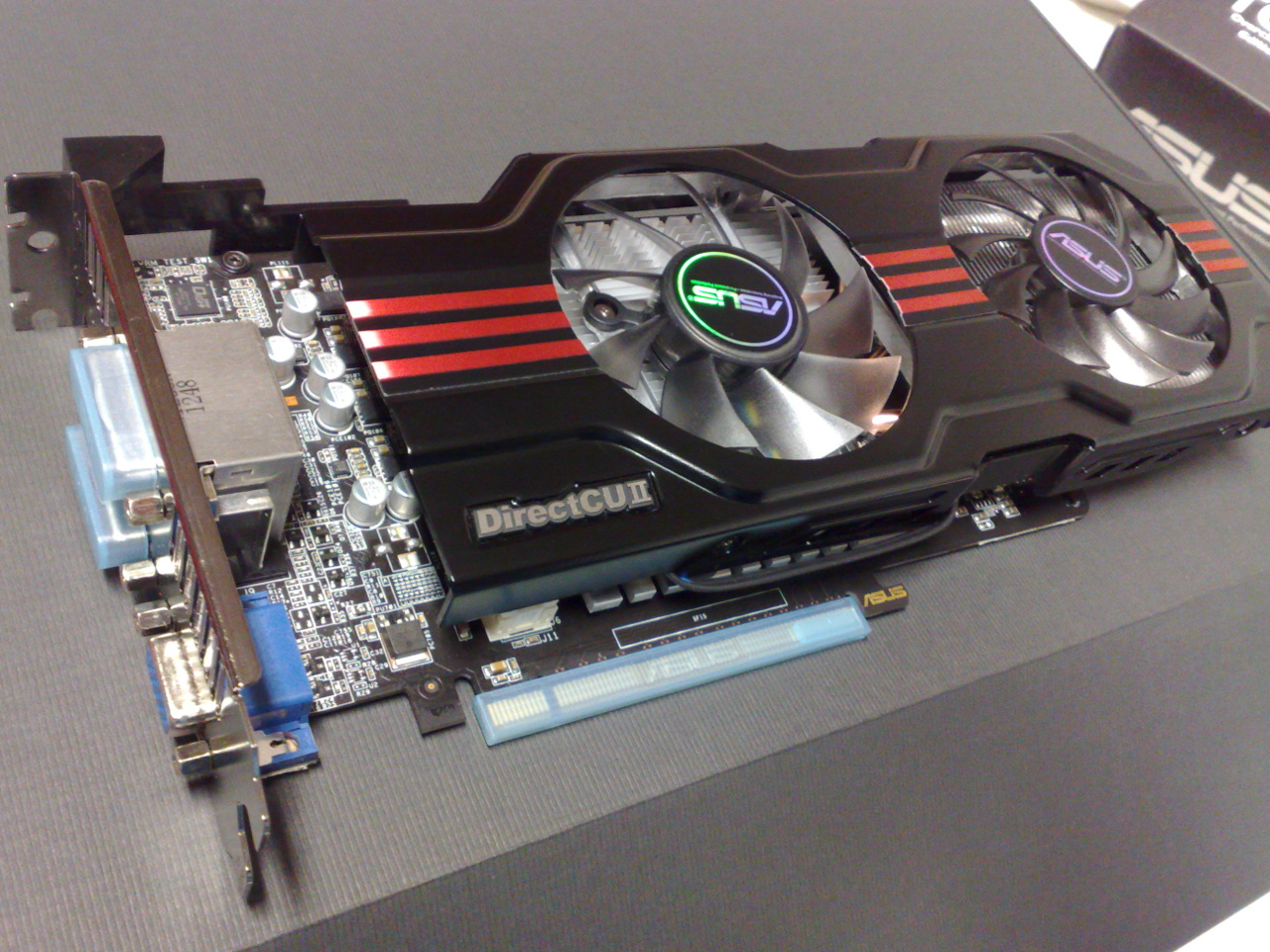
ASUS GeForce GTX 650 Ti, a PCI Express 3.0 ×16 graphics card, using two fans for cooling

Used to cool the heatsink of the graphics processing unit or the memory on graphics cards. These fans were not necessary on older cards because of their low power dissipation, but most modern graphics cards designed for 3D graphics and gaming need their own dedicated cooling fans. Some of the higher powered cards can produce more heat than the CPU (dissipating up to 350 watts), so effective cooling is especially important. Since 2010, graphics cards have been released with either axial fans, or a centrifugal fan also known as a blower, turbo or squirrel cage fan.

=== Chipset fan ===
Used to cool the heatsink of the northbridge of a motherboard's chipset; this may be needed where the system bus is significantly overclocked and dissipates more power than as usual, but may otherwise be unnecessary. As more features of the chipset are integrated into the central processing unit, the role of the chipset has been reduced and the heat generation reduced also.

=== Hard-drive cooling ===
Fans may be mounted next to or onto a hard disk drive for cooling purposes. Hard drives can produce considerable heat over time, and are heat-sensitive components that should not operate at excessive temperatures. In many situations, natural convective cooling suffices, but in some cases fans may be required. These may include:

- Faster-spinning hard disks with greater heat production. (As of 2011 less expensive drives rotated at speeds up to 7,200 RPM; 10,000 and 15,000 RPM drives were available but generated more heat.)
- Large or dense arrays of disks (including server systems where disks are typically mounted densely)
- Any disks which, due to the enclosure or other location they are mounted in, cannot easily cool without fanned air

=== Multiple purposes ===
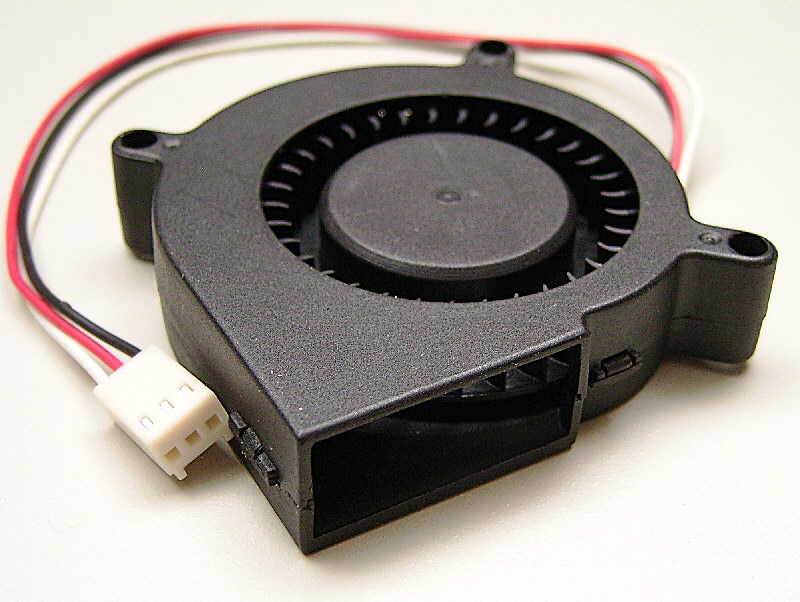
A small blower fan is used to direct air across a laptop computer's CPU cooler.

A case fan may be mounted on a radiator attached to the case, simultaneously operating to cool a liquid cooling device's working fluid and to ventilate the case. In laptops, a single blower fan often cools a heat sink connected to both CPU and GPU using heat pipes. In gaming laptops and mobile workstations, two or more heavy duty fans may be used. In rack-mounted servers, a single row of fans may operate to create an airflow through the chassis from front to rear, which is directed by passive ducts or shrouds across individual components' heat sinks.

=== Other purposes ===
Fans are, less commonly, used for other purposes such as:

- Water-cooling radiator transfers a lot of heat, and radiator fans have large static pressure (opposed to case fans that have high airflow) for dissipating heat.
- Laptop computers lack large openings in the case for warm air to escape. The laptop may be placed on a cooler – somewhat like a tray with fans built in – to ensure adequate cooling.
- Some high-end machines (including many servers) or when additional reliability is required, other chips like SATA/SAS controller, high speed networking controllers (40 Gbps Ethernet, Infiniband), PCIe switches, coprocessor cards (for example some Xeon Phi), some FPGA chips, south bridges are also actively cooled with a heatsink and a dedicated fan. These can be on a main motherboard itself or as a separate add-on board, often via PCIe card.
- Expansion slot fan – a fan mounted in one of the PCI or PCI Express slots, usually to supply additional cooling to the graphics cards, or to expansion cards in general.
- Optical drive fan – some internal CD and DVD burners included cooling fans.
- Memory fan – modern computer memory can generate enough heat that active cooling may be necessary, usually in the form of small fans positioned above the memory chips. This applies especially when the memory is overclocked or overvolted, or when the memory modules include active logic, such as when a system uses Fully Buffered DIMMs (FB-DIMMs). However, with newer lower voltages in use, such as 1.2v DDR4, this is less commonly needed than used to be the case. Most of the time memory modules, located close to CPU will receive enough of the air flow from the case or CPU fan, even if the air from CPU fan and radiator is warm. If the main CPU is water cooled, this small amount of airflow might be missing, and additional care about some airflow in a case or a dedicated memory cooling is required. Unfortunately most memory modules do not provide temperature monitoring to easily measure it.

== Physical characteristics ==
Due to the low pressure, high volume air flows they create, most fans used in computers are of the axial flow type; centrifugal and crossflow fans type. Two important functional specifications are the airflow that can be moved, typically stated in cubic feet per minute (CFM), and static pressure. Given in decibels, the sound volume figure can be also very important for home and office computers; larger fans are generally quieter for the same CFM. Fan blades can have serrations to reduce noise.

=== Dimensions ===
Fan sizes and corresponding screw hole spacing
Fan size (mm)	Center of mounting hole spacing (mm)
40	32
50	40
60	50
70	60
80	71.5
92	82.5
120	105
140	124.5
200	154
220	170

The dimensions and mounting holes must suit the equipment that uses the fan. Square-framed fans are usually used, but round frames are also used, often so that a larger fan than the mounting holes would otherwise allow can be used (e.g., a 140 mm fan with holes for the corners of a 120 mm square fan). The width of square fans and the diameter of round ones are usually stated in millimeters. The dimension given is the outside width of the fan, not the distance between mounting holes. Common sizes include 40 mm, 60 mm, 80 mm, 92 mm, 120 mm and 140 mm, although 8 mm, 17 mm, 20 mm, 25 mm, 30 mm, 35 mm, 38 mm, 45 mm, 50 mm, 70 mm, 160 mm, 170 mm, 180 mm, 200 mm, 220 mm, 230 mm, 250 mm and 360 mm sizes are also available. Typical 120 mm and 140 mm fans are 25 mm in thickness/height (i.e. along the axis of airflow). "Slim" fans, which are 15 mm thick, are also available; they are typically used in space-constrained scenarios. Thicker 30 mm-thick fans also exist, offering increased performance at the cost of reduced compatibility. Less common thicknesses include 10 mm, 14 mm, 28 mm, 32 mm, and 38 mm.

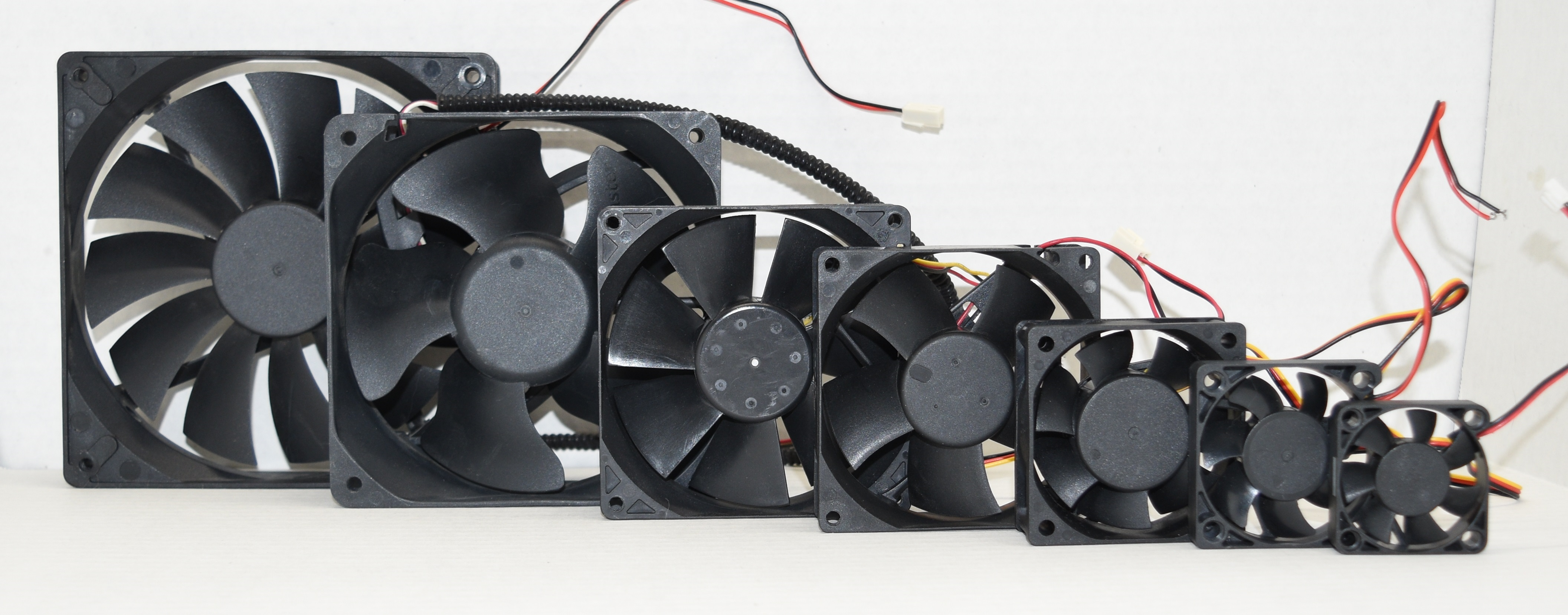
Fan sizes from left to right: 140 mm, 120 mm, 92 mm, 80 mm, 60 mm, 50 mm and 40 mm.

Typically, square 120 mm and 140 mm fans are used where cooling requirements are demanding, as for computers used to play games, and for quieter operation at lower speeds. Larger fans are usually used for computer case cooling, CPUs with large heatsinks, and ATX power supplies. Square 80 mm and 92 mm fans are used in less demanding applications, or where larger fans would not be compatible. Smaller fans are usually used for cooling CPUs with small heatsinks, SFX power supplies, graphics cards, northbridges, etc.

=== Rotational speed ===
The speed of rotation (specified in revolutions per minute, RPM) together with the static pressure determine the airflow for a given fan. Where noise is an issue, larger, slower-turning fans are quieter than smaller, faster fans that can move the same airflow. Fan noise has been found to be roughly proportional to the fifth power of fan speed; halving the speed reduces the noise by about 15 dB. Axial fans may rotate at speeds of up to around 38,000 rpm for smaller sizes.

Fans may be controlled by sensors and circuits that reduce their speed when temperature is not high, leading to quieter operation, longer life, and lower power consumption than fixed-speed fans. Fan lifetimes are usually quoted under the assumption of running at maximum speed and at a fixed ambient temperature.

=== Air pressure and flow ===
A fan with high static pressure is more effective at forcing air through restricted spaces, such as the gaps between a radiator or heatsink; static pressure is more important than airflow in CFM when choosing a fan for use with a heatsink. The relative importance of static pressure depends on the degree to which the airflow is restricted by geometry; static pressure becomes more important as the spacing between heatsink fins decreases. Static pressure is usually stated in either mm Hg or mm H_{2}O. Thicker fans typically have higher static pressure than slim fans.

=== Bearing types ===
The type of bearing used in a fan can affect its performance and noise. Most computer fans use one of the following bearing types:

Sleeve bearing
These use two surfaces lubricated with oil or grease as a friction contact. They often use porous sintered sleeves to be self-lubricating, requiring only infrequent maintenance or replacement. Sleeve bearings are less durable at higher temperatures as the contact surfaces wear and the lubricant dries up, eventually leading to failure; however, lifetime is similar to that of ball-bearing types (generally a little less) at relatively low ambient temperatures. Sleeve bearings may be more likely to fail at higher temperatures, and may perform poorly when mounted in any orientation other than vertical. The typical lifespan of a sleeve-bearing fan may be around 30,000 hours at 50 °C (122 °F). Fans that use sleeve bearings are generally cheaper than fans that use ball bearings, and are quieter at lower speeds early in their life, but can become noisy as they age.
Rifle bearing
These are similar to sleeve bearings, but are quieter and have almost as much lifespan as ball bearings. The bearing has a spiral groove in it that pumps fluid from a reservoir. This allows them to be safely mounted with the shaft horizontal (unlike sleeve bearings), since the fluid being pumped lubricates the top of the shaft. The pumping also ensures sufficient lubricant on the shaft, reducing noise, and increasing lifespan.
Fluid bearing or fluid dynamic bearing (FDB)
These have the advantages of near-silent operation and high life expectancy (though not longer than ball bearings), but tend to be more expensive.
Ball bearing
Though generally more expensive than fluid bearings, ball-bearing fans do not suffer the same orientation limitations as sleeve bearing fans, are more durable at higher temperatures, and are quieter than sleeve-bearing fans at higher rotation speeds. The typical lifespan of a ball bearing fan may be over 60,000 hours at 50 °C (122 °F).
Magnetic bearing or maglev bearing
In which the fan is repelled from the bearing by magnetism.

=== Connectors ===
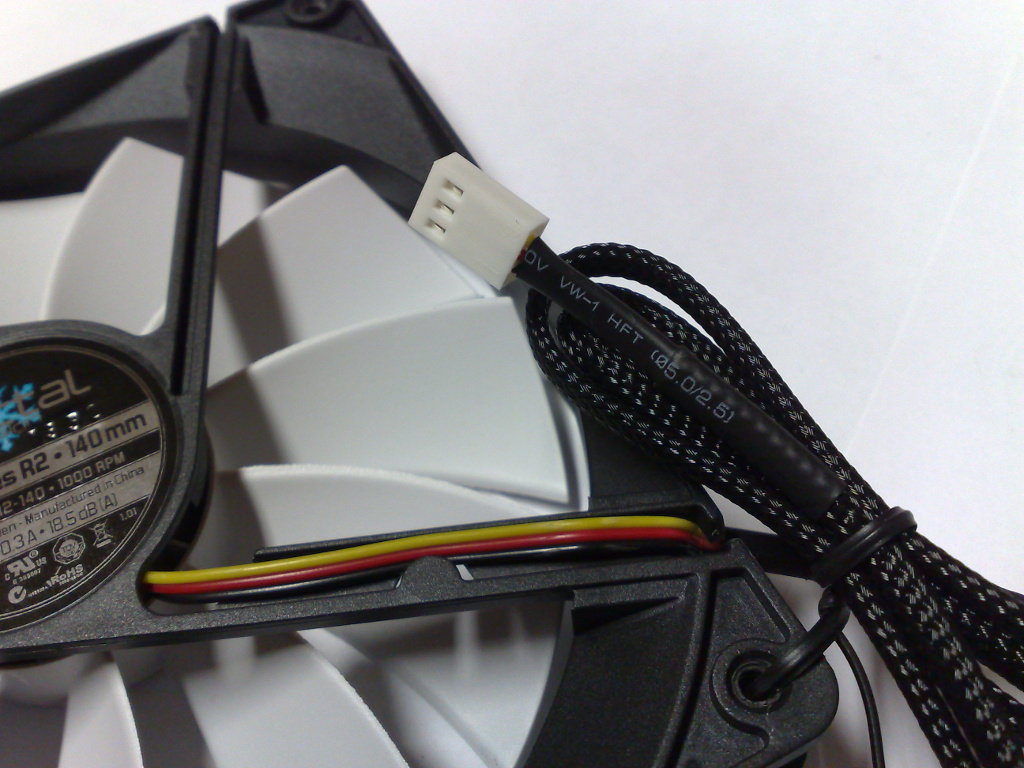
Three-pin connector on a computer fan

Connectors usually used for computer fans are the following:

Three-pin Molex connector KK family
This Molex connector is used when connecting a fan to the motherboard or other circuit board. It is a small, thick, rectangular in-line female connector with two polarizing tabs on the outer-most edge of one long side. Pins are square and on a 0.1 inch (2.54 mm) pitch. The three pins are used for ground, +12 V power, and a tachometer signal. The Molex part number of receptacle is 22-01-3037. The Molex part number of the individual crimp contacts is 08-50-0114 (tin plated) or 08-55-0102 (semi gold plated). The matching PCB header Molex part number is 22-23-2031 (tin plated) or 22-11-2032 (gold plated). A corresponding wire stripper and crimping tools are also required.

Four-pin Molex connector KK family
This is a special variant of the Molex KK connector with four pins but with the locking/polarisation features of a three-pin connector. The additional pin is used for a pulse-width modulation (PWM) signal to provide variable speed control. These can be plugged into 3-pin headers, but will lose their fan speed control. The Molex part number of receptacle is 47054-1000. The Molex part number of individual crimp contacts is 08-50-0114. The Molex part number of the header is 47053-1000.

Four-pin Molex connector
This connector is used when connecting the fan directly to the power supply. It consists of two wires (yellow/12 V and black/ground) leading to and splicing into a large in-line four-pin male-to-female Molex connector. The other two wires of the connector provide 5V (red) and ground (black too), and are not used in this case. This is the same connector as used on hard drives before the SATA became standard.

Three-pin Molex connector PicoBlade family
This connector is used with notebook fans or when connecting the fan to the video card.

Dell proprietary
This proprietary Dell connector is an expansion of a simple three-pin female IC connector by adding two tabs to the middle of the connector on one side and a lock-tab on the other side. The size and spacing of the pin sockets is identical to a standard three-pin female IC connector and three-pin Molex connector. Some models have the wiring of the white wire (speed sensor) in the middle, whereas the standard 3-pin Molex connector requires the white wire as pin #3, thus compatibility issues may exist.

Others
Some computer fans use two-pin connectors, of various designs.

== Alternatives ==
If a fan is not desirable, because of noise, reliability, or environmental concerns, there are some alternatives. Some improvement can be achieved by eliminating all fans except one in the power supply which also draws hot air out of the case.

Systems can be designed to use passive cooling alone, reducing noise and eliminating moving parts that may fail. This can be achieved by:

- Natural convection cooling: carefully designed, correctly oriented, and sufficiently large heatsinks can dissipate up to 100 W by natural convection alone
- Heatpipes to transfer heat out of the case
- Undervolting or underclocking to reduce the need for heat dissipation, by lowering voltage or reducing compute intensity
- Submersive liquid cooling, placing the motherboard in a non-electrically conductive fluid, provides excellent convection cooling and protects from humidity and water without the need for heatsinks or fans.

Other methods of cooling include:

- Water cooling
- Mineral oil
- Liquid nitrogen
- Refrigeration, e.g. by Peltier effect devices
- Ionic wind cooling is being researched, whereby air is moved by ionizing air between two electrodes. This replaces the fan and has the advantage of no moving parts and less noise.

== See also ==
- Glossary of computer hardware terms
- Computer cooling – Process of removing waste heat from a computer
- Computer fan control – Management of the rotational speed of a computer fan
- Quiet PC – Type of personal computer
- Small form factor (SFF)
- Software programs for controlling PC fans: Argus Monitor and SpeedFan
