= Socket G3 =

Socket G3 may refer to:

- AMD Socket G3
- Intel Socket G3

== See also ==
- CPU socket
