= Spiral groove bearing =

Hydrodynamic bearings using spiral grooves to develop lubricant pressure

Spiral groove bearings (also known as Rifle bearings) are self-acting (journal and thrust), or hydrodynamic bearings used to reduce friction and wear without the use of pressurized lubricants. They have this ability due to special patterns of grooves. Spiral groove bearings are self-acting because their own rotation builds up the pressure needed to separate the bearing surfaces. For this reason, they are also contactless bearings.

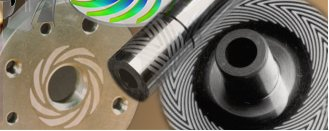
Examples of spiral groove bearings with journal and thrust forms.

== Operation ==
Spiral groove thrust bearings produce the required pressure to keep the bearing surfaces lubricated and separated purely by the pumping effect of the grooves, whereas journal, conical and spherical forms also get extra pressure generation by the hydrodynamic bearing wedge action. When the parts of the bearings are rotated with respect to each other the grooves push the lubricant through the bearing between the surfaces causing an overall rise in the pressure.

The motion of the surfaces will then cause the fluid to flow over the grooves and a pressure ripple, perpendicular to the direction of the motion, is formed. Between the surface of the bearings and the fluid, a net pressure rise occurs because this flow is limited by a plain bearing section or another set of grooves producing a pressure rise that acts to counter the pressure rise created by the first set of grooves (herringbone pattern). At a sufficient speed, the internal pressures create enough force to support the applied load and the bearing surfaces are completely separated. It is the pressure acting perpendicular to the direction of motion that supports the bearing load.

Most gases or liquids can be used as the lubricant, including refrigerants, liquid metals, oil, grease, water or air.

This explanation neglects the effects of inertia, compressibility of the lubricant and other factors.

== Fabrication ==
The dimensions of the grooves are tailored to the intended operating conditions of the bearing. If the indentations on the grooved surface are too deep, then there will be significant leakage of the lubricant. If the depth is reduced, the pump effect will stop. The speed of the rotation of the bearing surfaces and the accuracy of the dimensions must also be taken into account. Designers and manufactures calculate the optimal dimensions for greatest efficiency. The grooves are made by the following methods:

- Etching
- Selective etching
- Mechanical grooving
- Soldering
- Laser machining

=== Etching ===
Etching is easiest way to make spiral groove bearings. The surface of the metal is coated with an etchant-resistant lacquer, then the intended locations of the grooves are removed by hand. The factors that affect the properties of the grooves in this method are:

- etching time
- temperature of the etchant bath
- movement of the metal through the bath
- circulation of the etchant

Despite the simplicity of this method, there is a significant disadvantage: the groove depth is non-uniform and is therefore fairly inaccurate.

=== Selective etching ===
This method differs from regular etching as two layers are placed on the surface to be grooved, but only the upper layer is exposed to the etchant, leaving the lower surfaces protected.

=== Mechanical grooving ===
This method is used when more accurate and more uniform grooves are required. The grooves are cut by an electrical diameter cutter. The disc surface is rotated, and the cutter is steered by a guider ring, so that the spirals have the required logarithmic shape.

One disadvantage of this method is that more specialized equipment is required to accurately cut smaller grooves. (approximately 6 cm and less).

=== Soldering ===
Soldering is used when other fabrication methods are unavailable or inapplicable to the given situation; e.g., the bearing is too large for an etching bath. A foil on which the grooves have been etched is obtained, and is soldered onto the flat bearing surface.

The factors that are considered in this method are:

- the temperature at which the bearing is to be used
- the size of the bearings
- the nature of the materials to be connected.

=== Laser machining ===
Modern lasers have made the production of precise grooves easier and more affordable, but not all lasers nor laser companies have the required technology. A good supplier will produce precise constant depth grooves in ceramic or metal parts to within fractions of a micrometer, including proper logarithmic grooves for thrust bearings.

== Types ==
These are main types of spiral groove bearings.

=== Journal ===
Cylindrical form journal bearings with a herringbone pattern of spiral grooves gives a bearing with excellent load capacity, resistance to cavitation and excellent stability.

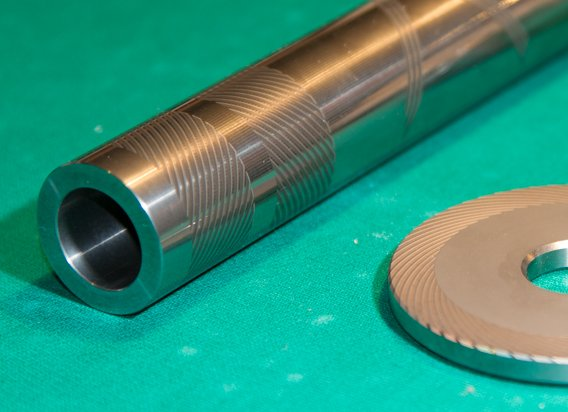
Spiral groove journal and thrust bearings using air as a lubricant.

The symmetric herringbone pattern has zero flow which reduces the possibility of entraining dirt into the bearing, but spiral groove journal bearings are also found with a single pattern that produces a through flow of lubricant. This feature has been used to produce a known volume of flow for constant-flow diesel-pump metering systems.

=== Flat thrust ===
Flat thrust bearings, the most common spiral groove bearings, are so named because one consists of a flat surface that opposes the grooved surface.

Variations in this type of bearing come from the nature of the spiral surface and the type of fluid flow. The following is a list of the different types of flat thrust bearings:

- With transverse flow
- Herringbone grooved, without transverse flow
- Partially grooved (inwardly or outwardly pumping)
- With constant restriction to transverse flow.

=== Spherical thrust ===
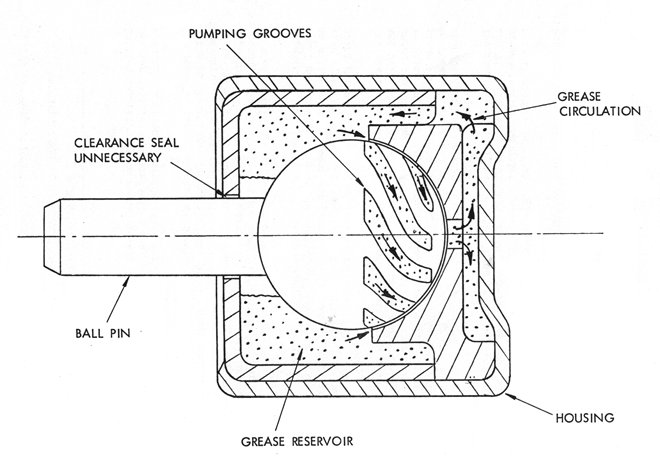
Hemi-spherical grease lubricated spiral groove bearing used in low noise fans.

A spherical (or more usually a hemispherical) thrust bearing consists of a sphere that rotates concentrically in a spherical cup with groove patterns.

The image shows the grease lubricated spiral groove hemispherical bearing invented by Ron Woolley of the Gas Bearing Advisory Service at Southampton University in collaboration with British Gas.

=== Conical thrust ===
In these bearings, a cone is cut out of the end of a cylindrical shaft. On the surface of the cone next to the cylindrical part, the grooves are made.

== History and applications ==
Spiral groove bearings were invented in the UK and one of the first published papers was that by Whipple from which they were originally referred to as Whipple grooves. During the 1960s and 1970s there was an explosion in analytic methods for their design and numerous applications were tried. Much of the history can be seen throughout the publications of the International Gas Bearing Symposium

Spiral groove bearings were used most successfully in inertial gyroscopes for planes and ships. In this application, the spiral groove bearings were made of boron carbide ceramic and the grooves were manufactured by ION beam. The bearings were very successful, with MTBF values over 100,000 hours and stop-start capability of 1,000,000 times.

Due to the multiple technical advantages, thrust bearings continue to be used in gyroscopes such as in the Hubble Telescope.

Many other applications have arisen over the last 20 years in compressors and turbines taking advantage of the oil-free, long life, low friction and clean green characteristics.

One major application area is that of the dry gas seal where a spiral groove thrust bearing acts to lift the seal faces apart creating a narrow seal gap that prevents contact and wear. These are very successful and have been applied to many industrial compressors.

Another notable use of spiral groove bearings is in cryogenic expanders. They are used here to support the high speed rotation of turbines, and to minimize power losses due to inefficiency. Cryogenic expanders extract energy from the streams of gases that enter it, causing a rapid decrease in temperature, and the energy extracted is used to rotate the turbines.

== Advantages ==
The following lists the advantages of using spiral groove bearings as opposed to other self-acting bearings.

- They are easy and inexpensive to manufacture compared to tilting pad bearings
- They have zero wear when running and will operate for very long periods of time
- They have excellent stability (all gas bearings suffer from stability issues, spiral groove ones are some of the best)
- They can be made for use in smaller devices and maintain efficiency
- They offer precise running location allowing for fine tip clearances and improved efficiency
- They operate well with gas or air lubricant and as such are completely oil-free and are perfect for clean green applications

== Design ==
There are some spreadsheet design methods on the market for incompressible lubricants (oil, water), but for compressible gas lubricants one has to resort to numerical methods and specialist design companies. Generally the analysis of spiral groove bearings requires a numerical method solving the Reynolds Equation although there are some optimum parameters published. Modern CFD methods are not suitable for general design work as the number of elements around the bearing and across the clearance makes the analyses too slow. The critical design aspect for all bearings using compressible gas lubricants is stability whereas for in-compressible fluids load and power loss become equally important.

== See also ==
- Computer fan – Miniature fan used in a computer for active cooling
