= HyperCloud Memory =

HyperCloud
- Inception: 2009
- Manufacturer: Netlist, Inc.
- Website: netlist.com

HyperCloud Memory (HCDIMM) is a DDR3 SDRAM dual in-line memory module (DIMM) used in server applications requiring a great deal of memory. It was initially launched in 2009 at the International Supercomputing Conference by Irvine, California, based company, Netlist Inc. It was never a JEDEC standard, and the main server vendors supporting it were IBM and Hewlett Packard Enterprise.

== Technical ==
HCDIMM is a 240-pin, 72 bit-wide, load reduced, DDR3 SDRAM dual in-line memory module (DIMM). According to Cirrascale, "while LRDIMM requires a special BIOS configuration, HyperCloud provides seamless plug-and-play operation with past, current and future generations of Intel processors."

The logic function embedded into the register device and the isolation devices used on the HCDIMM performs rank multiplication and load reduction functions which allows the system to increase its performance and access high capacity memory modules. The register device "re-drives the command, address and clock signals" from the host memory controller to the DRAM chips and presents four physical ranks of memory as two virtual ranks to the memory controller on the processor.

Rank multiplication allows maximum memory densities on each server memory channel while the isolation device makes four DRAM appear as one to the memory controller. This reduces the electrical load all while allowing high density DIMMs to run at high speeds. HCDIMM has a lower bit-to-bit data skew and latency due to its distributed architecture by having multiple isolation devices between the DRAM and data bus.
