= Sommerfeld number =

Dimensionless parameter in fluid mechanics

In the design of fluid bearings, the Sommerfeld number (S) is a dimensionless quantity used extensively in hydrodynamic lubrication analysis. The Sommerfeld number is very important in lubrication analysis because it contains all the variables normally specified by the designer.

The Sommerfeld number is named after Arnold Sommerfeld (1868–1951).

== Definition ==
The Sommerfeld Number is typically defined by the following equation:

$$S = \left( \frac{r}{c} \right)^2 \frac {\mu N}{P}$$

where:

S is the Sommerfeld Number or bearing characteristic number
r is the shaft radius
c is the radial clearance
μ is the absolute viscosity of the lubricant
N is the speed of the rotating shaft in rev/s
P is the load per unit of projected bearing area

The second part of the equation is seen to be the Hersey number. However, an alternative definition for S is used in some texts based on angular velocity:

$$S = \left( \frac{r}{c} \right)^2 \frac {\mu N}{P} =\left( \frac{r}{c} \right)^2 \frac {\mu \omega L D}{W}$$

where:

$\omega$ is angular velocity of the shaft in rad/s.
W is the applied load
L is the bearing length
D is the bearing diameter

It is therefore necessary to check which definition is being used when referring to design data or textbooks, since the value of S will differ by a factor of 2π.

== Derivation ==
=== Petrov's law ===
Nikolai Pavlovich Petrov's method of lubrication analysis, which assumes a concentric shaft and bearing, was the first to explain the phenomenon of bearing friction. This method, which ultimately produces the equation known as Petrov's law (or Petroff's law), is useful because it defines groups of relevant dimensionless parameters, and predicts a fairly accurate coefficient of friction, even when the shaft is not concentric.

Considering a vertical shaft rotating inside a bearing, it can be assumed that the bearing is subjected to a negligible load, the radial clearance space is completely filled with lubricant, and that leakage is negligible. The surface velocity of the shaft is: $U = 2 \pi r N$, where N is the rotational speed of the shaft in rev/s.

The shear stress in the lubricant can be represented as follows:

$$\tau = \mu \left.\frac{\partial u}{\partial y}\right|_{y = 0}$$

Assuming a constant rate of shear,

$$\tau = \mu \frac{U}{h} = \frac{2 \pi r \mu N}{c}$$

where c is the radial clearance.

The torque required to shear the film is

$$T = \left( \tau A \right) \left( r \right) = \left( \frac {2 \pi r \mu N}{c} \right) \left( 2 \pi r l \right) \left( r \right) = \frac {4 \pi^2 r^3 l \mu N}{c}$$

If a small radial load W acts on the shaft and hence the bearing, the frictional drag force can be considered equal to the product fW, with the friction torque represented as

$$T = f Wr = 2 r^2 f l P$$

Where

W is the force acting on the bearing
P is the radial load per unit of project bearing area (Pressure)
f is the coefficient of friction

If the small radial load W is considered negligible, setting the two expressions for torque equal to one another and solving for the coefficient of friction yields

$f = 2 \pi^2 \frac{\mu N}{P} \frac{r}{c}$

Which is known as Petroff's law or the Petroff equation. It provides a quick and simple means of obtaining reasonable estimates of coefficients of friction of lightly loaded bearings.
