= Intel Skulltrail =

Enthusiast gaming platform

Skulltrail is an enthusiast gaming platform released by Intel on February 19, 2008. It is based on Intel's 5400 "Seaburg" workstation chipset. The primary difference between Skulltrail and Intel's current and past enthusiast chipsets is a dual CPU socket design that allows two processors to operate on the same motherboard. Therefore, Skulltrail can operate eight processing cores on one system. The platform supports two Core 2 Extreme QX9775 processors (commonly mistaken for the Core 2 Extreme QX9770, which is the LGA775 counterpart), which operate at 3.2 GHz.

Skulltrail was one of the first platforms to support SLI on chipsets not designed by Nvidia. It achieves this by including two NVIDIA nForce 100 PCIe 1.1 switch chips (two x16 to one x16). The implementation of SLI supports Quad SLI technology, which is achieved through the use of two dual-GPU graphics cards from NVIDIA, including the GeForce 9800 GX2. This gives a total of four graphics processors. Owners of Skulltrail systems can also make use of up to four ATI graphics cards using ATI CrossFireX technology, which made SkullTrail the only platform to support both SLI and CrossFire with public drivers at the time of release. The HP Firebird 803 also supported SLI on one (proprietary, MXM) motherboard at the time, but the drivers were special and only available for Firebird hardware.

== Public demonstrations ==
Intel demonstrated Skulltrail at the Fall 2007 Intel Developer Forum in San Francisco, California, and at the 2008 Consumer Electronics Show in Las Vegas, Nevada.

Skulltrail has a front side bus rate of 400 MHz (1600 MHz QDR), and was demonstrated with two 45 nanometer High-κ processors running at 3.2 GHz. During the IDF, a 4.0 GHz phase cooled Skulltrail system was demonstrated. Then on October 22, 2007, the two processors were demonstrated running at 4.4 GHz with water cooling. They were demonstrated again on October 31, 2007, this time running at 5.0 GHz, with phase change cooling. On April 18, 2008, Tom's Hardware, reporting from an Overclocking Enthusiast site, reported that an overclocked speed of 6.006 GHz was achieved on an 8-core Skulltrail setup.

== System components ==
=== Core 2 Extreme QX9775 ===
- Four processor cores in one processor package
- 3.2 GHz clock frequency
- 1600 MHz FSB
- Fabricated on 45 nm process
- 12 MiB L2 cache (6 MiB per core pair)

=== Intel D5400XS motherboard ===
- Two LGA 771 CPU sockets (supports Xeon DP processors)
- Four FB-DIMM slots supporting maximum 16 GB of system memory at 800 MHz
- Four x16 PCI Express 1.1a slots
- Two PCI 2.3 slots
- Six SATA 3.0 Gbit/s ports
- Two eSATA ports
- Ten USB ports

== Criticisms and issues ==
Although found to be an extremely powerful computing platform, Skulltrail was criticized by media outlets for being "ahead of its time". This is in part due to the lack of support for multi-core computing with almost all popular game engines at the time, in addition to the extremely high price of the components involved. The use of FB-DIMMs due to the workstation chipset has also been pointed at as a major limiting factor for Skulltrail. although this limitation can be mitigated by purchasing specially designed Kingston HyperX FB-DIMMS that have a lower latency than generic FB-DIMMs

The base Skulltrail platform consists of an Intel D5400XS mainboard which cost upwards of US$600 when it hit the market as a standalone part. Computers based on the Skulltrail platform also require high-output power supplies for both the CPU and graphics cards, along with a computer chassis capable of accommodating the motherboard, which is based on an Extended ATX form factor design. However, Atomic reported that they could accommodate cheaper Xeon server microprocessors that fit in the LGA-771 socket, which was corroborated by Intel's official processor support list.

Intel's Skulltrail D5400XS motherboard was made with two nForce chips. The Skulltrail D5400XS motherboard became now just one of the motherboards available, along with motherboards with X58 and P55 chipsets, that runs both nVidia's SLI and ATI's Crossfire platforms out of the box with public hardware drivers.
