= AMD Socket G3 =

Unreleased CPU socket for AMD CPUs

Socket G3
- Type: LGA
- Contacts: 1305
- FSB protocol: ?
- FSB frequency: 200 MHz System clock max 2.6 GHz HyperTransport 3.0
- Voltage range: ?
- Processors: N/A (never released)
- This article is part of the CPU socket series

The Socket G3, originally as part of the codenamed Piranha server platform, was supposed to be the intermediate successor to Socket F and Socket F+ to be used in AMD Opteron processor for dual-processor (2P) and above server platforms scheduled to be launched 2009. The Socket G3 would have been accompanied by the Socket G3 Memory Extender (Socket G3MX), for connecting large amounts of memory to a single microprocessor by a G3MX chip placed on the motherboard.

AMD had planned socket G3 to arrive with the advent of the previously planned 8-core MCM chip code named Montreal. Since Q1 2008, the plan for and 8-core MCM server chip based on 45 nm K10.5 design has been scrapped in favor of a 6-core fully integrated MPU design code named Istanbul, which would use the existing socket F/F+ platform, produced by Nvidia, Broadcom, as well as Fiorano to be introduced by AMD in 2009.

However, socket G3 was officially discontinued as of March 2008. The socket that was the successor to the Socket F is the LGA 1974-pin Socket G34.

== See also ==
- AMD 800 chipset series
