= Foil bearing =

Type of air bearing

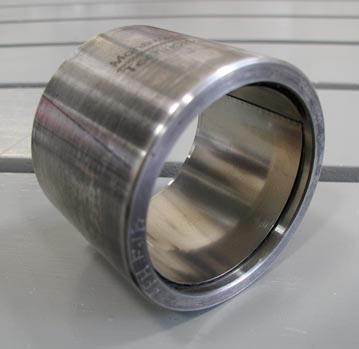
A foil-air bearing for the core rotor shaft of an aircraft turbine engine.

A foil bearing, also known as a foil-air bearing, is a type of air bearing. A shaft is supported by a compliant, spring-loaded journal lining made of foil. Once the shaft is spinning fast enough at high speeds, the working fluid (usually air) pushes the foil away from the shaft, initiates an air gap, so that no contact or wear occurs. The shaft and foil are separated by the air's high pressure, which is generated by shaft rotation pulling gas into the bearing. Unlike aerostatic or hydrostatic bearings, foil bearings require no external pressurisation system for the working fluid, so the fluid-dynamic bearing is self-starting.

== Development ==
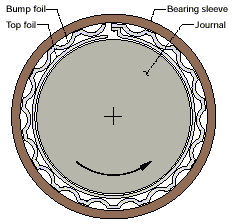
Foil Bearing

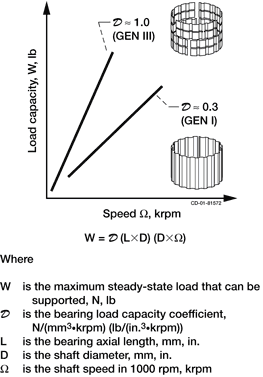
Load capacity against rotation speed, for Gen I and Gen III bearings

Foil bearings were first developed in the late 1950s by AiResearch Mfg. Co. of the Garrett Corporation using independent R&D funds to serve military and space applications. They were first tested for commercial use in United Airlines Boeing 727 and Boeing 737 cooling turbines in the early and mid-1960s. Garrett AiResearch air cycle machine foil bearings were first installed as original equipment in 1969 in the DC-10's environmental control systems. Garrett AiResearch foil bearings were installed on all US military aircraft to replace existing oil-lubricated rolling-contact bearings. The ability to operate at cryogenic gas temperatures and at very high temperatures gave foil bearings many other potential applications.

Current-generation foil bearings with advanced coatings have greatly exceeded the limitations of earlier designs. Antiwear coatings exist that allow over 100,000 start/stop cycles for typical applications.

== Applications ==
Turbomachinery is the most common application because foil bearings operate at high speed.

Commercial applications in production include microturbines, fuel cell blowers, Chiller compressors and air cycle machines. The largest known foil bearing in a commercial application is 130 mm journals with 230 mm thrust bearings in a 450 RT refrigerant compressor. The main advantage of foil bearings is the elimination of the oil systems required by traditional bearing designs. Other advantages are:

- Higher efficiency, due to a lower heat loss to friction; instead of fluid friction, the main source of heat is parasitic drag
- Increased reliability
- Higher speed capability
- Quieter operation
- Wider operating temperature range (40–2,500 K)
- High vibration and shock load capacity
- No scheduled maintenance
- No external support system
- Truly oil free where contamination is an issue
- Capable of operating above critical speed

Areas of current research are:

- Higher load capacity
- Improved damping
- Improved coatings
- Thickness of bump foil

The main disadvantages are:

- Lower capacity than roller or oil bearings
- Wear during start-up and stopping
- High speed required for operation

== See also ==
- Fluid bearing – Type of bearings which use pressurized liquid or gas between the bearing surfaces
- Tribology – Science of rubbing surfaces
