= Netlist, Inc. =

International SSD manufacturer from Irvine, California

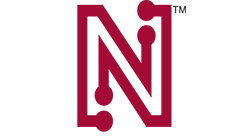
- Type: Public
- Traded as: OTCQB: NLST
- Industry: Tech Hardware & Semiconductors
- Founded: 2000; 26 years ago
- Founder: Hong Chun-ki
- Headquarters: Irvine, California, U.S.
- Area served: Worldwide
- Key people: Hong Chun-ki (CEO and director) Gail Sasaki (CFO and EVP)
- Revenue: ▲US$ 142.4 million (2021)
- Net income: ▲US$ 4.8 million (2021)
- Total assets: ▲US$ 91.2 million (2021)
- Total equity: ▲US$ 54.0 million (2021)
- Number of employees: ▲120 (2021)
- Website: netlist.com

Netlist, Inc. is a Delaware-registered corporation headquartered in Irvine, California that designs and sells high-performance SSDs and modular memory subsystems to enterprise customers in diverse industries. It also manufactures a line of specialty and legacy memory products to storage customers, appliance customers, system builders and cloud and datacenter customers. Netlist holds a portfolio of patents in the areas of server memory, hybrid memory, storage class memory, rank multiplication and load reduction. Netlist has more than 120 employees and an annual revenue of US$142.4 million as of 2021 The stock was added to NASDAQ in late 2006. In the initial public offering of its common stock in 2006, Netlist sold 6,250,000 shares at $7.00 each. On September 26, 2018, Netlist announced they were moving from NASDAQ and currently trades on the OTCQB.

As of 2019, Netlist was reportedly in favorable claim for patents infringed upon by Google and South Korean Company, SK Hynix. The company, founded by former LG Corporation employee Hong Chun-ki (also named Chun Ki Hong and Chun K. Hong) in 2000, entered a product supply and technological joint development agreement with Samsung Electronics in 2015. In 2020, Netlist brought a lawsuit against Samsung in the Federal District Court for allegedly breaching its obligations under that agreement. On February 15, 2022, the United States District Court Judge Mark C. Scarsi issued a Judgement in Netlist's favor on all counts, and expressly confirmed that any license Samsung had previously enjoyed to Netlist's patent was effectively terminated.

As of August 2023, Netlist has secured a $303M jury verdict against Samsung for violation of patents. On August 15, 2023, Netlist put out a direct offering of shares for $30M of funding being managed by Roth Capital. This has caused a 40% crash in the stock price.

== Notable partnerships and licenses ==
- April 5, 2021: Netlist and SK hynix Enter into Strategic Agreements for Patents, Technology and Product Supply. The agreement includes a patent cross license covering memory technologies of both companies and an agreement for the supply of SK hynix products and technical cooperation on Netlist's CXL HybriDIMM technology.
- October 13, 2020: Digi-Key Electronics and Netlist Announce U.S. Marketplace Distribution Partnership to provide customers with access to Netlist's NVMe SSD product line.
- November 19, 2015: Netlist Announces Strategic Partnership With Samsung For New Storage Class Memory

== Products ==
Enterprise SSD

- Enterprise and Data Center NVMe SSD in multiple form factors and capacities built using PCI Express (PCIe) Gen4 & Gen3 protocols

Embedded flash

- Offering high-performance, high-capacity flash solutions optimized for the embedded and server market in a wide range of form factors and dimensions

Memory Module DDR4 DIMMs

- A wide lineup of commercial and industrial grade DDR4 DIMMs. These modules operate reliably in harsh, long-life computing environments and densely configured computing applications with limited airflow

== Technology and innovations ==
HyperCloud (industry's first LRDIMM)

- Introduced in 2009, HyperCloud is a load reduced DDR3 DIMM performing rank multiplication and load reduction functions which allows the system to increase its performance and access high-capacity memory modules. At DDR4, the memory industry adopted the architecture as the standard for all Load Reduced DIMMs.

NetVault (Non-Volatile DIMM - NVDIMM)

- Netlist created the DDR2 NVDIMM utilizing equal densities of both DRAM and NAND to provide a persistent memory source in the event of a power failure, initially for RAID applications. Years later, the industry standardized on this application as NVDIMM-N to be used within servers in the main memory channel.

HyperVault/HybriDIMM (NVDIMM-H)

- HyperVault was created to provide the highest density server memory modules using lower cost NAND devices to operate as DRAM to the system. DRAM is typically ten times the cost of NAND and HyperVault was released as a 512 GB module using only 16 GB of DRAM. Today, the technology is being utilized to create next generation high density CXL heterogenous memory.

== Intellectual property ==
Netlist holds a portfolio of patents in the areas of server memory, hybrid memory, storage class memory, rank multiplication and load reduction. The company has a portfolio of more than 130 issued and pending U.S. and foreign patents

- November 12, 2019: USPTO Issues New RDIMM Patent to Netlist relating to memory modules capable of handshaking with the host system in high-speed memory operations.
- February 19, 2019: United States Patent Trial and Appeal Board Upholds Validity of Netlist's '912 Patent in response to Google's rehearing request. Google began its petition for reexamination of the '912 patent starting in 2010.
- January 31, 2017: Netlist Awarded New Patent For High-Speed RDIMM And LRDIMM Memory Modules. The patent covers various handshaking technologies that are effective when setting the proper timing for DDR4 RDIMM and LRDIMM memory modules.
