= Reynolds equation =

Differential equation describing pressure distribution of thin viscous fluids

In fluid mechanics (specifically lubrication theory), the Reynolds equation is a partial differential equation governing the pressure distribution of thin viscous fluid films. It was first derived by Osborne Reynolds in 1886. The classical Reynolds Equation can be used to describe the pressure distribution in nearly any type of fluid film bearing; a bearing type in which the bounding bodies are fully separated by a thin layer of liquid or gas.

== General usage ==
The general Reynolds equation is:
$$\frac{\partial}{\partial x}\left(\frac{\rho h^3}{12\mu}\frac{\partial p}{\partial x}\right)+\frac{\partial}{\partial y}\left(\frac{\rho h^3}{12\mu} \frac{\partial p}{\partial y}\right) = \frac{\partial}{\partial x} \left(\frac{\rho h \left( u_a + u_b \right)}{2}\right)+\frac{\partial}{\partial y} \left(\frac{\rho h \left( v_a + v_b \right)}{2}\right)+\rho\left(w_a-w_b\right) - \rho u_a\frac{\partial h}{\partial x} - \rho v_a \frac{\partial h}{\partial y} + h\frac{\partial \rho}{\partial t}$$

Where:

- $p$ is fluid film pressure.
- $x$ and $y$ are the bearing width and length coordinates.
- $z$ is fluid film thickness coordinate.
- $h$ is fluid film thickness.
- $\mu$ is fluid viscosity.
- $\rho$ is fluid density.
- $u, v, w$ are the bounding body velocities in $x, y, z$ respectively.
- $a, b$ are subscripts denoting the top and bottom bounding bodies respectively.

The equation can either be used with consistent units or nondimensionalized.

The Reynolds Equation assumes:

- The fluid is Newtonian.
- Fluid viscous forces dominate over fluid inertia forces. This is the principle of the Reynolds number.
- Fluid body forces are negligible.
- The variation of pressure across the fluid film is negligibly small (i.e. $\frac{\partial p}{\partial z} = 0$)
- The fluid film thickness is much less than the width and length and thus curvature effects are negligible. (i.e. $h \ll l$ and $h \ll w$).

For some simple bearing geometries and boundary conditions, the Reynolds equation can be solved analytically. Often however, the equation must be solved numerically. Frequently this involves discretizing the geometric domain, and then applying a finite technique - often FDM, FVM, or FEM.

== Derivation from Navier-Stokes ==
A full derivation of the Reynolds Equation from the Navier-Stokes equation can be found in numerous lubrication text books.

== Solution of Reynolds Equation ==
In general, Reynolds equation has to be solved using numerical methods such as finite difference, or finite element. In certain simplified cases, however, analytical or approximate solutions can be obtained.

For the case of rigid sphere on flat geometry, steady-state case and half-Sommerfeld cavitation boundary condition, the 2-D Reynolds equation can be solved analytically. This solution was proposed by a Nobel Prize winner Pyotr Kapitsa. Half-Sommerfeld boundary condition was shown to be inaccurate and this solution has to be used with care.

In case of 1-D Reynolds equation several analytical or semi-analytical solutions are available. In 1916 Martin obtained a closed form solution for a minimum film thickness and pressure for a rigid cylinder and plane geometry. This solution is not accurate for the cases when the elastic deformation of the surfaces contributes considerably to the film thickness. In 1949, Grubin obtained an approximate solution for so called elasto-hydrodynamic lubrication (EHL) line contact problem, where he combined both elastic deformation and lubricant hydrodynamic flow. In this solution it was assumed that the pressure profile follows Hertz solution. The model is therefore accurate at high loads, when the hydrodynamic pressure tends to be close to the Hertz contact pressure.

== Applications ==
The Reynolds equation is used to model the pressure in many applications. For example:

- Ball bearings
- Air bearings
- Journal bearings
- Squeeze film dampers in aircraft gas turbines
- Human hip and knee joints
- Lubricated gear contacts

== Reynolds Equation adaptations - Average Flow Model ==
In 1978 Patir and Cheng introduced an average flow model, which modifies the Reynolds equation to consider the effects of surface roughness on lubricated contacts. The average flow model spans the regimes of lubrication where the surfaces are close together and/or touching. The average flow model applied "flow factors" to adjust how easy it is for the lubricant to flow in the direction of sliding or perpendicular to it. They also presented terms for adjusting the contact shear calculation. In these regimes, the surface topography acts to direct the lubricant flow, which has been demonstrated to affect the lubricant pressure and thus the surface separation and contact friction.

Several notable attempts have been made to taken additional details of the contact into account in the simulation of fluid films in contacts. Leighton et al. presented a method for determining the flow factors needed for the average flow model from any measured surface. Harp and Salent extended the average flow model by considering the inter-asperity cavitation. Chengwei and Linqing used an analysis of the surface height probability distribution to remove one of the more complex terms from the average Reynolds equation, $d\bar{h_T}/dh$ and replace it with a flow factor referred to as contact flow factor, $\phi_h$. Knoll et al. calculated flow factors, taking into account the elastic deformation of the surfaces. Meng et al. also considered the elastic deformation of the contacting surfaces.

The work of Patir and Cheng was a precursor to the investigations of surface texturing in lubricated contacts. Demonstrating how large scale surface features generated micro-hydrodynamic lift to separate films and reduce friction, but only when the contact conditions support this.

The average flow model of Patir and Cheng, is often coupled with the rough surface interaction model of Greenwood and Tripp for modelling of the interaction of rough surfaces in loaded contacts.
