= Air caster =

Pneumatic lifting device used to move heavy loads on flat, non-porous surfaces

Animation of how an air caster operates. Dark blue represents compressed air; light blue represents the air film (or cushion) that the device rides on.

An air caster is a pneumatic lifting device used to move heavy loads on flat, non-porous surfaces. Its operation is similar to a hovercraft, as it uses a thin layer of air as a way to float a very small distance off the ground. Compressed air enters an airbag shaped like a torus, and when the bag is filled it creates an airtight seal with the ground, and forces more air into the center of torus, eventually causing the air to flow over the bag and to raise the load above the ground.

The compressed air is forced under the airbag, pushing it and the load less than a millimeter off the ground.

== Limitations ==
Air casters require a smooth, non-porous surface in order to maintain lift and operate properly. Cracks and other surface defects can interrupt the proper flow of air, causing the air cushion to dissipate and thus lose its ability to lift. This limits their application to fields like manufacturing, where such surfaces are abundant. Also necessary is connection to a system which provides compressed air, as well as a power supply.

Usually, standard concrete warehouse or factory floors provide an adequate surface. Large cracks and expansion joints may need to be filled in. Overlay material can provide options for moving over rough surfaces. (Example: One can use an overlay material to move onto an area of broom finished concrete outside. The overlay material can be sheet metal or a heavy gauge plastic sheet material.)

== History ==
The air caster (originally called the air bearing) was invented by Harry A Mackie in December 1961 as the “pendant air bearing load supporting device” for General Motors Corporation as an alternative to the overhead crane, which ran opposed to a rail, creating friction free movement. In November 1963, Mackie, on behalf of General Motors Corporation, filed a patent for an “air bearing support with automatic air flow regulation”. This was the first air caster designed to be used on the ground.

In January 1964, David R. Snoeyenbos, while working for General Motors Corporation, revised the design of the air caster, and filed a patent for a “reversible air bearing support”. General Motors Corporation manufactured air casters, or “air bearings” for several years, then sold the rights to Snoeyenbos, who moved to Decatur, Illinois to found Airfloat. He launched his company from his brother's manufacturing shop in 1964, and officially incorporated as the Airfloat Corp in 1967.
