= AMD Live! =

2005 Advanced Micro Devices' initiative

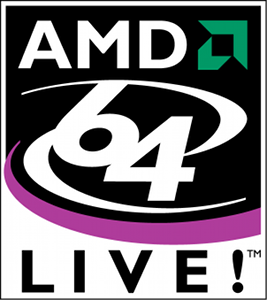

AMD Live! is the name of AMD's initiative in 2005 aimed at gathering the support of professional musicians and other media producers behind its hardware products. The primary focus of this initiative was the Opteron server- and workstation-class central processing units (CPUs).

AMD subsequently extended AMD LIVE! into a platform marketing initiative focusing the consumer electronics segment in 2006 and focused on performance segment desktop-class processors. AMD Live! for consumer electronics segment was announced on January 4, 2006 officially through press release.

The AMD Live! is an initiative, which can be divided into two parts, one in terms of software and the other, computer hardware. The software portion focuses on users' internet and multimedia experiences, while the hardware sector focuses on the ability of a system to handle multimedia files and the convergence of consumer electronics (CE) and personal computing (PC) into one computer chassis.

== Features ==
AMD Live! features away mode (as supported by motherboards), the system hibernates when user is not using, and powers up quickly when needed. The AMD Live! also includes a selection of software aimed to enhance the digital entertainment experience named as AMD LIVE! Entertainment Suite, see software section for details.

== Hardware configurations ==
=== AMD LIVE! PC ===
According to AMD, the minimum requirements of an AMD LIVE! PC platform are as follows:

- Dual-core and quad-core AMD processors
  - Athlon 64 X2 / Athlon X2 4200+ or above
  - Athlon 64 FX except FX-70 series
  - Phenom series processors
- PSU with cooling fan and heatsink
- 1 GB DDR2 RAM
- SATA hard disks with recommended NCQ support
  - For FX processor series based systems, RAID array of 2 or more SATA hard disks is required
- DVD+/-RW optical disc drive
- Graphic card supporting Aero graphics
  - For FX series processors based systems, dual or multi graphics card configuration is required (SLI or CrossFire)
- Display output: VGA, DVI, HDMI with optional HDCP
- Up to 7.1 Surround Sound output (optional: S/PDIF output)
- Microsoft Windows XP Media Center Edition or Windows Vista Home Premium or Ultimate
- Recommended components:
  - Wireless keyboard and pointer device (mouse)
  - TV tuner (ATI HDTV Wonder/TV Wonder, OpenCable)
- Optional components:
  - Remote control
  - Gigabit Ethernet
  - Wireless network connectivity: 802.11g or a combination of 802.11a/g

AMD announced the AMD LIVE! will feature support for Blu-rays and HD DVDs in third quarter of 2007.

=== AMD LIVE! Notebook PC ===
Announced in CES 2007, the AMD LIVE! Notebook PC requires:

- AMD Turion 64 X2 CPU
- Other system components follow the guidelines of subsequent AMD mobile platforms starting from codenamed Kite platform, systems with the platform will be qualified for a better by design sticker as the shown on the right.

=== AMD LIVE! Home Cinema System ===
Originally launched at CES in 2007, AMD LIVE! Home Cinema was a platform that combines the functionality of a PC with that of a Home Theater system that integrates a high performance amplifier (up to 5.1 channels) allowing owners to access and store high definition content such as movies and broadcasts, along with DVR/PVR functionality, photos and slide slows, music and internet content out of a single device.

AMD has also pushed an MCE system design named "AMD Home Cinema B media center", which is a collaborative project with MCE system builders, including AMD hardware (AMD processors, ATI Radeon graphics with hardware High-definition video decoding) and pre-installed with Windows Vista Home Premium, and AMD branded chassis (manufactured by ACE computers), to be released in 2007.

The AMD LIVE! Home Cinema system has the following specifications:

- AMD Athlon 64 X2 CPU
- ATI TV Wonder Digital Cable Tuner
- Integrated 5-channel surround sound class-D amplifier system (with at least 100 Watts output/channel)
- Mandatory requirement for an infra-red remote control

Systems including the MSI Media LIVE Bermuda and Asus BVI reference design, Alienware, and ASUS.

==== Maui platform ====
AMD's latest product in this line up is the "Maui" platform. Working in conjunction with Intersil's D2Audio and MSI, one of the productized version of the platform became the MSI's Media Live Diva platform.

The platform has the following updated specifications:

- AMD RS780 chipset
  - Supporting the full HD Video resolution specifications, including 1080p, 1080i and 720p
  - Capable of playing back Blu-rays

The MSI Media Live Diva platform involve the integration of the DAE-3 chip into the motherboard design. This allows MSI to offer this platform with either a 5 channel amplifier add in card or a 7 channel pre amplifier add in card.

=== AMD LIVE! Media Server ===
Another item announced in CES 2007 is the AMD LIVE! Media Server, systems including the HP MediaSmart Media server.

Specifications including:

- Running on Microsoft Windows Home Server
- AMD Sempron processors
- DTX form factor motherboard
- RAID functionality

=== AMD LIVE! Ultra PC/AMD LIVE! Ultra notebook PC ===
AMD LIVE! Ultra PC sticker

Announced in CES 2008, the AMD LIVE! Ultra PC and the AMD LIVE! Ultra notebook PC utilizes a complete high-end AMD platform which complies with the codenamed Spider/Cartwheel desktop platform or the codenamed Puma mobile platform, what differs from the previous systems is that the requirement for in-house graphics products became mandatory while the system requires more high-end and more powerful products, but the other requirements of the AMD LIVE! Ultra PC remained the same as the others. A new better by design sticker for AMD LIVE! Ultra PC was also released.

The specifications of the system including:

- Multi-core AMD Phenom processor or Turion Ultra processor
- ATI Radeon HD 2000/3000 family of graphics products (including Mobility Radeon HD 2000/3000 series)
  - May also include integrated graphics
  - (Optional) ATI CrossFire technology
- AMD chipsets
- Other requirements of the AMD LIVE! PC

== Software ==
=== AMD LIVE! Entertainment Suite ===
A selection of software to provide additional features to enhance online multimedia experiences, listed as follows:

- On Demand by Orb Networks software - TV recording and sharing software
- Compress - Video Compression Software that compress videos up to one tenth of the original size
- Network Magic - Network surveillance and management software
- LogMeIn - Remote Access software
- Media Vault - 25GB of free online storage
- Communicator powered by SightSpeed - Instant messaging software
- Games powered by WildTangent
- KidRocket - Web browser for kids which filters inappropriate materials.

Several additional software and services were announced in CES 2007, listed below:

- PodShow TV
- MyTV ToGo powered by Roxio
- Fusion Tunes powered by Proxure
- MCE Backup powered by Proxure
- TV Genie powered by Proxure
- Digital Courier powered by YouSendIt

=== AMD LIVE! Explorer ===
Back in AMD Technology Analyst Day 2007, AMD had shown a prototype of a centralized GUI for AMD LIVE! for easy control and management of AMD LIVE! exclusive contents. The software was later named as AMD LIVE! Explorer and the beta testing version was released during CES 2008 and available for download. The software features a centralized "Live! mode" 3D panorama interface called "Carousel" for browsing images, albums and videos as thumbnails. The application also includes an embedded browser, with picture-in-picture mode for watching videos while surfing the web at the same time.

== Related initiatives ==
=== AMD LIVE! Ready ===
Prior to the beginning of CeBIT 2007 in Hanover, Germany on March 15, 2007, AMD has announced the "AMD LIVE! ready" program, for other peripherals or system components, items which are certified for AMD Live! systems can include the AMD LIVE! Ready program logo (shown on the right) on the package to allow customers to identify the products recommended for AMD LIVE! systems.

Some of the supporting companies including Gigabyte Technology, Buffalo Technology, Corel Corporation, Creative Technology, D-Link Systems, Nero AG, Netgear, NVIDIA, Orb Networks, Seagate, TerraTec, and ZyXEL.

Product categories in the AMD LIVE! Ready program include:

- Set-top boxes
- Portable media players
- Music Devices, such as MP3 players
- Network Devices
- TV tuners
- Storage Devices, such as harddisks and optical disc drives
- Webcams or web cameras
- Software applications for Windows Vista

=== Active TV initiative ===
The announcement of Active TV initiative has also taken place prior to CeBIT 2007, the initiative allows online video watching such as YouTube, ROO, Veoh and VMIX, allowing users to create customized "TV-web channels", and provide to hardware developers a "value-added" solution as software that is embedded on networked entertainment devices, such as HDTVs, set-top-boxes, and game consoles. Active TV software can for example be loaded on a game CD for a game console, such as the home network connected PS2 (provided by BroadQ). The console then pulls video, music, and image content from the Internet, via a networked PC running Active TV software. The support of such functions for Xbox 360 and Wii platforms is projected at a later time.

AMD has started a webpage about the initiative and provided a simulator for Windows XP and Vista download. (Active-TV page)
