= AMD mobile platform =

Open platform for laptops by AMD

The AMD mobile platform is an open platform for laptops from AMD. Though little marketing was done on this platform, it has been competing with the Centrino platform in the segment to gain more marketshare. Each platform has its own specification, catching up the latest technology developments. Since the acquisition of ATI, AMD began to include Mobility Radeon GPUs and AMD chipsets as part of the requirements of the mobile platform; the first of such platforms is the Puma platform.

== Open platform approach ==
In February 2007, AMD had announced the "Better by Design" initiative to continue the success of the open platform approach for desktop back in early 2003 after the launch of Athlon 64 processors with a lack of chipset being developed by AMD, and open the platform to chipset vendors such as VIA, SiS, NVIDIA and from AMD subsidiary ATI. The initiative also includes platforms succeeding the Kite Refresh mobile platform.

Under the "Better by Design" initiative, AMD introduced a three-cell arrow sticker to identify mobile platform products, which the top cell being the processor (as Turion 64 X2). The middle cell for graphics accelerators as NVIDIA or ATI (as a result of retaining the use of "ATI Radeon" branding for graphics), including onboard graphics (IGP), while the last cell representing the wireless (Wi-Fi, IEEE 802.11 standard) or LAN solutions, provided by one of the following companies: Airgo, Atheros, Broadcom, Marvell, Qualcomm, and Realtek.

The stickers to be used will be further classified by the system performance according to the processor performance, and into five classes, each having different colours as well as different logos for each component, listed as follows:

Class	Processor	Sticker		Related brands	Other components
Class	Processor	Border	Background	Related brands	Other components
Good Single-core	Mobile Sempron	grey	white	none	Graphics: ATI (Mobility Radeon/Radeon Xpress), NVIDIA (GeForce/nForce IGP); Wireless connectivity and management: Broadcom, Qualcomm, Atheros, Airgo, Marvell, Realtek
Good Dual-core	Athlon X2	grey	white	none	Graphics: ATI (Mobility Radeon/Radeon Xpress), NVIDIA (GeForce/nForce IGP); Wireless connectivity and management: Broadcom, Qualcomm, Atheros, Airgo, Marvell, Realtek
Better Dual-core	Turion 64 X2	Silver	Silver	none	Graphics: ATI (Mobility Radeon/Radeon Xpress), NVIDIA (GeForce/nForce IGP); Wireless connectivity and management: Broadcom, Qualcomm, Atheros, Airgo, Marvell, Realtek
Best Dual-core	Turion 64 X2	Gold	Gold	none	Graphics: ATI (Mobility Radeon/Radeon Xpress), NVIDIA (GeForce/nForce IGP); Wireless connectivity and management: Broadcom, Qualcomm, Atheros, Airgo, Marvell, Realtek
Best Dual-core for digital media	Turion 64 X2	Silver	Silver w/ AMD Live! logo	AMD Live!	Graphics: ATI (Mobility Radeon/Radeon Xpress), NVIDIA (GeForce/nForce IGP); Wireless connectivity and management: Broadcom, Qualcomm, Atheros, Airgo, Marvell, Realtek
AMD Live! Ultra Notebook PC (Puma)	Turion Ultra	Black	Silver	AMD Live!	Graphics: ATI (Mobility Radeon/Radeon Xpress), NVIDIA (GeForce/nForce IGP); Wireless connectivity and management: Broadcom, Qualcomm, Atheros, Airgo, Marvell, Realtek

== Market analysis ==
According to AMD figures in December 2007, AMD mobile platform gained 19% unit share in the market and about 23% revenue share of the firm during Q3 2007 while competing with the Intel Centrino platform. Figures for Q1 and Q2 2007 are 15% and 17% unit share, accounting for 14% and 16% of the company's revenue respectively.

AMD's mobile platform, even as recent as the Turion 64 X2 platform, has been criticized as consistently performing worse than Intel's Centrino in all areas: system speed, heat dissipation, and battery life.

== Implementations ==
=== Initial platform (2003) ===
Launched in 2003, the initial platform for mobile AMD processors consists of:

AMD mobile	Initial platform
Mobile processor	Processors - Socket 754: Mobile Sempron single-core 32-bit processor (codenamed Dublin, Sonora, Roma), or; Mobile Athlon 64 single-core 64-bit processor (codenamed ClawHammer, Odessa, Oakville), or; Turion 64 single-core 64-bit processor (codenamed Lancaster)
Mobile chipset	D-sub and HyperTransport 1.0; DDR-400 SO-DIMM

=== Kite platform (2006) ===
Introduced in 2006, the Kite platform consists of:

AMD mobile	Kite platform
Mobile processor	Processors - Socket S1: Mobile Sempron single-core 64-bit processor (codenamed Keene), or; Turion 64 single-core 64-bit processor (codenamed Richmond), or; Turion 64 X2 dual-core 64-bit processor (codenamed Taylor, Trinidad)
Mobile chipset	DVI and HyperTransport 1.0; DDR2-667 SO-DIMM
Mobile support	Wireless IEEE 802.11 b/g mini-PCIe WiFi adapter

=== Kite Refresh platform (2007) ===
AMD used Kite Refresh as the codenamed for the second-generation AMD mobile platform introduced in February 2007.

AMD mobile	Kite Refresh platform
Mobile processor	Processors - Socket S1: Turion 64 X2 dual-core 64-bit Hawk family processor 65 nm (codenamed Tyler), or; Mobile Sempron single-core 64-bit processor 65nm (codenamed Sherman)
Mobile chipset	HDMI, HyperTransport 1.0 and PCI Express 1.0; DDR2-800 SO-DIMM
Mobile support	Wireless IEEE 802.11 a/b/g/draft-N support, mini-PCIe Wi-Fi adapter; Hybrid hard drives; Alert Standard Format (ASF) 2.0; Trusted Platform Module (TPM)

=== Puma platform (2008) ===
The Puma platform introduced in 2008 with June 2008 availability for the third-generation AMD mobile platform consists of:

AMD mobile	Initial platform
Mobile processor	Processors: Dual-core 64-bit codenamed Griffin of processors, named "Turion X2 Ultra", or; Mobile Sempron single-core 64-bit processor (codenamed Sable), with the following: Split-power planes and linked power management support; Support for possible low voltage processors
Mobile chipset	AMD M780 series chipset: Mobility Radeon HD 3000 series GPU on 55 nm process; ATI Hybrid Graphics; Hybrid CrossFire; PowerXpress; HyperFlash - memory modules on motherboard with ReadyBoost; DisplayPort, HyperTransport 3.0 and PCI Express 2.0 support; DDR2-800 SO-DIMM
Mobile support	Wireless IEEE 802.11 a/b/g/n mini-PCIe Wi-Fi adapter; Hybrid hard drives; Desktop and mobile Architecture for System Hardware (DASH) 1.0 support; Trusted Platform Module (TPM) support

=== Yukon platform (2009) ===
The Yukon platform was introduced on January 8, 2009, with expected April availability for the first AMD Ultrathin Platform targeting the ultra-portable notebook market.

AMD mobile	Initial platform
Mobile processor	Processors: Single-core 64-bit codenamed Huron of processors, named "Athlon Neo", or; Mobile Sempron single-core 64-bit processor (codenamed Huron), with the following: 27 mm (W) × 27 mm (D) × 2.5 mm(H) BGA package, named "ASB1"; low voltage processors
Mobile chipset	AMD 690E series chipset + SB600 southbridge: Mobility Radeon HD 3000 series GPU on 55 nm process (as option); DDR2 SO-DIMM
Mobile support	Wireless connectivity with 3G (as option); Wireless IEEE 802.11 a/b/g/n mini-PCIe Wi-Fi adapter

=== Congo platform (2009) ===
The Congo platform was introduced in September 2009, as the second AMD Ultrathin Platform targeting the ultra-portable notebook market.

AMD mobile	Initial platform
Mobile processor	Processors: Single or Dual-core 64-bit processors codenamed Conesus, with the following: made on 65 nm process; 15W (single-core) or 18W (dual-core) TDP; 27 mm (W) × 27 mm (D) × 2.5 mm(H) BGA package, named "ASB1"; low voltage processors; DDR2 SO-DIMM
Mobile chipset	AMD RS780M series chipset + SB710 southbridge: Mobility Radeon HD 3000 series GPU on 55 nm process (as option); RV610 graphics core; DirectX 10.0; UVD

=== Tigris platform (2009) ===
The Tigris platform introduced in September 2009 for the AMD Mainstream Notebook Platform consists of:

AMD mobile	Initial platform
Mobile processor	Processors: Single or Dual-core 64-bit processors codenamed Caspian, with the following: made on 45 nm process; 25W (single-core) or 35W (dual-core) TDP
Mobile chipset	AMD RS880M series chipset + SB710 southbridge: Mobility Radeon HD 4200 series GPU on 55 nm process; RV620 graphics core; DirectX 10.1; UVD 2

=== Nile platform (2010) ===
The Nile platform introduced on May 12, 2010, for the third AMD Ultrathin Platform consists of:

AMD mobile	Initial platform
Mobile processor	Processors: Single or Dual-core 64-bit processors codenamed Geneva, with the following: made on 45 nm process; support for DDR3 memory; 9W, 12W or 15W TDP
Mobile chipset	AMD RS880 series chipset + SB820 southbridge: Mobility Radeon HD 42xx GPU on 55 nm process; RV620 graphics core; DirectX 10.1; UVD 2

=== Danube platform (2010) ===
The Danube platform introduced on May 12, 2010, for the AMD Mainstream Notebook Platform consists of:

AMD mobile	Initial platform
Mobile processor	Processors: Single, Dual, Triple or Quad-core 64-bit processors codenamed Champlain, with the following: made on 45 nm process; support for DDR3 1066 and 1333 MHz memory; 25W, 35W or 45W TDP
Mobile chipset	AMD RS880 series chipset + SB820 southbridge: Mobility Radeon HD 42xx GPU on 55 nm process; RV620 graphics core; DirectX 10.1; UVD 2

=== Brazos (Fusion) platform (2011) ===
The AMD low-power platform introduced on January 4, 2011, is designed for HD netbooks and other emerging form factors. It features the 40 nm C-Series (formerly codenamed Ontario, a 9-watt APU for netbooks and small form factor desktops and devices) and E-Series (formerly codenamed Zacate, an 18-watt TDP APU for ultrathin, mainstream, and value notebooks as well as desktops and all-in-ones) APUs. Both low-power APU versions feature two Bobcat x86 cores and fully support DirectX11, DirectCompute (Microsoft programming interface for GPU computing) and OpenCL (cross-platform programming interface standard for multi-core x86 and accelerated GPU computing). Both also include UVD 3 dedicated hardware acceleration for HD video including 1080p resolutions. This platform consists of:

AMD mobile	Initial platform
Mobile processor	Processors: Single or dual-core 64-bit AMD APU C-Series (Ontario), and E-Series (Zacate) with the following: made on 40 nm CMOS process; support for DDR3 1333 MHz memory; 9W (C-Series) or 18W (E-Series) TDP; Mobility Radeon HD 6xxx GPU on 40 nm process; Cedar graphics core with 80 SP; DirectX 11; UVD 3
Mobile chipset	A50M (Hudson-M1)

=== Sabine (Fusion) platform (2011) ===
The Sabine platform introduced on June 30, 2011, for the AMD Mainstream Notebook Platform consists of:

AMD mobile	Initial platform
Mobile processor	Processors: Dual or Quad-core 64-bit AMD APU codenamed Llano, and with the following: made on 32 nm process; support for DDR3 1600 MHz memory; 35W or 45W TDP; Radeon HD 6xxxG GPU on 32 nm process; Sumo graphics core with up to 400 SP; DirectX 11; UVD 3
Mobile chipset	A60M, A70M (Hudson-M2, Hudson-M3)

=== Comal (Fusion) platform (2012) ===
The Comal platform introduced on May 15, 2012, for the AMD Mainstream Notebook Platform consists of:

AMD mobile	Initial platform
Mobile processor	Processors: Dual or Quad-core 64-bit AMD APU codenamed Trinity, and with the following: Piledriver cores made on 32 nm process; support for DDR3 1600 MHz memory; 17 W, 25 W or 35 W TDP; Radeon HD 7xxxG GPU on 32 nm process; London graphics core with up to 384 SP; DirectX 11; UVD 3.2
Mobile chipset	A60M, A70M (Hudson-M2, Hudson-M3)

== See also ==
- List of AMD mobile microprocessors
- List of AMD processors with 3D graphics
- List of AMD Turion microprocessors
- List of AMD Sempron microprocessors
- List of AMD Athlon 64 microprocessors
- List of AMD Phenom microprocessors
