= Vivo X7 =

2016 Android smartphone from Vivo

- Brand: Vivo
- Manufacturer: Vivo
- Type: Touchscreen Smartphone
- Series: Vivo X series
- Availability by region: June 2016
- Successor: Vivo X9
- Weight: 151 g (5 oz)
- Operating system: Android 5.1 (Lollipop)
- CPU: Octa-core (4x1.8 GHz Cortex-A72 & 4x1.4 GHz Cortex-A53)
- GPU: Adreno 510
- Memory: 4 GB RAM
- Storage: 64 GB
- Removable storage: microSD, up to 64 GB
- Battery: Non-removable Li-Ion 3000 mAh battery
- Rear camera: 13 MP
- Front camera: 16 MP
- Display: 5.2 in

Vivo X7 is an Android smartphone developed by Vivo Communication Technology Co. The phone was initially released in June 2016. It has a 5.2 in (13 cm) display, a 3000 mAh battery, and 13 and 16 MP cameras.

== Specifications ==
=== Software ===
Vivo X7 comes with Android 5.1 (Lollipop) operating system.

=== Hardware ===
Vivo X7 has a 5.2 in display with a resolution of 1080 x 1920 pixels. It has forward and backward facing cameras with resolutions of 16 and 13 MP, respectively. It is equipped with an Octa-core (4x1.8 GHz Cortex-A72 & 4x1.4 GHz Cortex-A53) CPU and an Adreno 510 GPU. It has a 3000 mAh battery and a fingerprint sensor.

== History ==
Vivo X7 was announced in June 2016 and released July of the same year. The phone sold at least 250,000 units in just the first day of its release.

== See also ==
- Android
- Smartphone
