= Intel Viiv =

Platform initiative from Intel

Intel Viiv logo.

Intel Viiv /ˈvaɪv/ or Intel Viiv technology was a brand name of Intel Corporation. Launched in 2006 and modeled after Intel's successful Centrino initiative, Viiv was intended as a "platform" for media-centric PCs, featuring specific combinations of hardware optimized for digital media, combined with Intel-provided "quick resume" and media server functionality, integration with other Viiv-certified products such as televisions, set-top boxes, and routers, as well as agreements with media companies to provide access to DRM-protected content for download and streaming.

Viiv was largely considered a market failure, with critics arguing that the specification was too broad, that Intel failed to adequately communicate its perceived advantages, that the resulting hardware and software functionality had few differences to what were already offered by PCs shipping with Windows XP Media Center Edition (which was part of the Viiv specification), and that Viiv was made more redundant after the release of Windows Vista. In October 2007, Intel announced that it would begin to phase out the Viiv branding, with systems being promoted for a period as "Intel Core 2 with Viiv technology".

== History ==
Viiv was first announced at the Intel Developer Forum in 2005 as a brand for PCs capable of handling digital audio and video; it was launched as part of an ongoing market strategy by Intel to promote combinations of its CPUs with other technologies as "platforms" (such as Centrino). Viiv consisted of hardware and software components intended to improve media performance, with Intel stating that Viiv PCs would offer performance for up to 1080p high-definition video playback, as well as "quick resume" functionality with power management comparable to consumer electronics devices such as DVD players. Intel would also certify other devices for Viiv compatibility, and offered "Hub Connect Technology" (HCT) for simplifying networking of compatible devices.

Viiv launched at the Consumer Electronics Show in January 2006 during a keynote by CEO Paul Otellini, which included appearances by actors Morgan Freeman, Danny DeVito, and Tom Hanks, as well as media executives such as Chase Carey (DirecTV, which announced plans to release a Viiv-compatible set-top box), and Jonathan Miller (AOL Time Warner). Intel promoted deals with internet video providers to provide enhanced functionality and video downloads for Viiv-compatible PCs, including AOL Time Warner (GameTap and "thousands of music videos, vintage television shows and sports highlights"), Eros International, ESPN, NBC Universal (which planned to offer exclusive video content from its coverage of the 2006 Winter Olympics), Shanghai Media Group, and Televisa. Morgan Freeman announced his upcoming film 10 Items or Less (released via ClickStar, a joint venture between Freeman and Intel) would be released via digital download two weeks after its theatrical premiere, with Viiv-certified PCs allowed to stream the film to televisions.

The first wave of Viiv-branded PCs were released in early-2006, although most of the promised features were not available on launch, and required an upcoming "1.5" software update that was to be released later in the year.

== Specifications ==
An Intel Viiv "verified" PC included:

- A multi-core Intel CPU, such as a Pentium D, Extreme Edition, or Core 2.
- An Intel P965 Express, 945GT Express, 945P Express, 945G Express, Mobile 945GM Express, 955X Express, or 975X Express chipset.
- A ICH7-DH southbridge (aside from the 945GM Express)
- Intel Pro Client LAN 82562 or 82573V/L Gigabit Ethernet.
- Intel HD Audio with at least 5.1 surround sound
- Intel Matrix Storage Technology
- Windows XP Media Center Edition 2005

The Viiv driver software included the "Viiv Media Server", which allowed users to stream media over a local network to other devices (such as televisions and set-top boxes) via Universal Plug and Play (UPnP) with transcoding support (Intel Smart Streaming Technology), "Viiv Zone" (a media player with a 10-foot interface and remote control support for supported media applications), and could stream compatible media applications to Viiv-certified devices. Viiv would also offer a framework for digital rights management schemes based on DTCP-IP, although Intel stopped short of endorsing any specific DRM method; a plugin implementing Windows Media DRM was included.

== Reception ==
In comparison to the more successful Centrino brand, Viiv was met with mixed reception due to its unclear positioning. The Register felt that Viiv was too broadly-defined and could just as easily cover mainstream, gaming, and home theater PCs that meet its specifications regardless of form factor, which would "not only make it hard to convince buyers that a Viiv-based PC is different from any other PC, but to get them to understand what exactly Viiv stands for." Technology writers argued that Intel inadequately communicated what advantages Viiv had (if any) over existing XP Media Center Edition hardware, nor the features it offered that could not already be accomplished with the base operating system, Windows Media Center application, and off-the-shelf hardware and software (with CNET noting Viiv's first wave of hardware were only an incremental upgrade over their existing Media Center PC products).

Due to its dependencies on Windows XP Media Center Edition (which was only available to OEMs) and proprietary DRM components as part of the certification process, some system builders promoted systems as being "Viiv ready" due to meeting most of the hardware requirements, but being unable to include the proprietary OS and DRM components needed to actually be Viiv-compatible. Ars Technica felt that Microsoft's recently-released Windows Vista and Xbox 360 video game console had accomplished much of the capabilities that Intel had envisioned for Viiv as part of their base software.

In October 2007, Intel announced that it would begin to scale back the Viiv branding, citing that most new PCs were beginning to include the hardware features that were part of the Viiv specifications as standard features to support Windows Vista, while the increasing prominence of online video services such as YouTube was making the original Viiv concept less relevant. As part of an amended branding scheme for its CPUs, the Viiv branding was replaced by "Intel Core 2 with Viiv technology", or "Core 2 Viiv".

== See also ==
- AMD Live!
- Intel vPro
- Vixs
