= AMD K8L =

AMD K8L, although not an official code name, has been suggested to refer to one of the following:

- AMD Turion 64, AMD's mobile-optimized Athlon 64 version
- AMD K10, AMD's next generation processor core
