= B350 =

B350 can refer to:

- The B350 chipset for AMD's socket AM4.
- The Beechcraft Super King Air 350 airplane.
