= Crucial X8 =

Solid-state drive

The Crucial X8 is an external solid-state drive (SSD) released by Crucial, a subsidiary of Micron Technology. It was released in 2019 and is the first portable flash storage device to be released by Micron after it sold off its previous subsidiary Lexar in 2017.

== Specifications ==
=== Hardware ===
The X8 connects to a host computer using a USB-C cable. Internally, the device uses an NVM Express (NVMe) SSD using quad-level cell (QLC) flash memory, providing lower performance than SSDs using triple-level cell (TLC) or 2-bit MLC flash. The drive is based on Crucial's P1 internal SSD, but with modifications to its firmware to optimize it for external storage rather than for an operating system installation. The internal SSD is connected to the external USB-C interface via an ASMedia 2362 bridge chip. Power for the drive is supplied via the USB connection, requiring the USB host port to be able to supply 5V at up to 1.5A. The drive was made available in capacities of 500 GB and 1 TB. The drive is formatted as exFAT by default.

=== Design ===
The X8 uses a black chassis constructed of anodized aluminum with plastic ends. It is 4.3 in (110 mm) long, 2.1 in (53 mm) wide, and 0.45 in (11.5 mm) thick.
