= List of AMD chipsets =

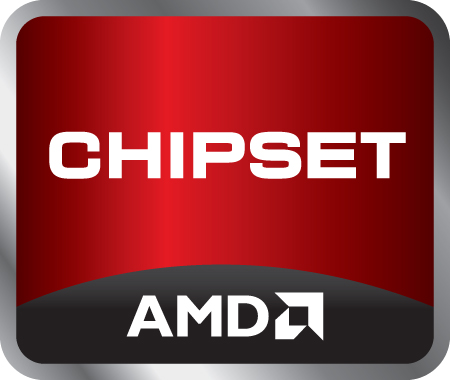
AMD chipsets logo

This is an overview of chipsets sold under the AMD brand, manufactured before May 2004 by the company itself, before the adoption of open platform approach as well as chipsets manufactured by ATI Technologies after October 2006 as the completion of the ATI acquisition.

== North- and Southbridges ==
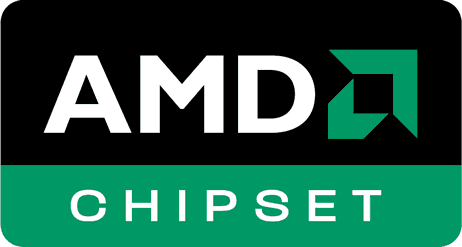
AMD Chipset logo, in use from around 2000 to 2011

=== Northbridges ===
==== AMD-xxx ====
Model	Code name	Released	CPU support	Fab (nm)	FSB/HT (MHz)	Southbridge	Features / notes
AMD-640 chipset	AMD-640	1997	K6, Cyrix 6x86	?	66 (FSB)	AMD-645	AMD licensed VIA Technologies' Apollo VP2/97
AMD-750 chipset	AMD-751	1999	Athlon, Duron (Slot A, Socket A), Alpha 21264	?	100 (FSB)	AMD-756, VIA-VT82C686A	AGP 2×, SDRAM; Irongate chipset family; early steppings had issues with AGP 2×; drivers often limited support to AGP 1×; later fixed with "super bypass" memory access adjustment.
AMD-760 chipset	AMD-761	Nov 2000	Athlon, Athlon XP, Duron (Socket A), Alpha 21264	?	133 (FSB)	AMD-766, VIA-T82C686B	AGP 4×, DDR SDRAM
AMD-760MP chipset	AMD-762	May 2001	Athlon MP	?	133 (FSB)	AMD-766	AGP 4×
AMD-760MPX chipset	AMD-762	May 2001	Athlon MP	?	133 (FSB)	AMD-768	AGP 4×, Hardware RNG; Most initial boards shipped without USB headers due to a fault with the integrated USB controller. Manufacturers included PCI USB cards to cover this shortcoming. A later refresh of the chipset had the USB problem remedied.
AMD-8000 series chipset	AMD-8111	Apr 2004	Opteron	?	800 (HT 1.x)	AMD-8131 AMD-8132	Hardware RNG

==== A-Link Express II ====
A-Link Express and A-Link Express II are essentially PCIe 1.1 x4 lanes.

See Comparison of ATI Chipsets for the comparison of chipsets sold under the ATI brand for AMD processors, before AMD's acquisition of ATI.

Model	Codename	Released	CPU support	Fab (nm)	HT (MHz)	IGP	CrossFire	Southbridge	Features / notes
AMD 480X chipset (originally CrossFire Xpress 1600)	RD480	Oct 2006	Athlon 64, Sempron	110	1000 (HT 2.0)	No	x8 + x8	SB600, ULi-M1575	?
AMD 570X/550X chipset (originally CrossFire Xpress 3100)	RD570	Jun 2007	Phenom, Athlon 64, Sempron	?	1000 (HT 2.0)	No	x16 + x8	SB600	?
AMD 580X chipset (originally CrossFire Xpress 3200)	RD580	Oct 2006	Phenom, Athlon 64, Sempron	?	1000 (HT 2.0)	No	x16 + x16	SB600	?
AMD 690V chipset	RS690C	Feb 2007	Athlon 64, Sempron	80	1000 (HT 2.0)	Radeon X1200 (350MHz)	No	SB600	DirectX 9.0, AVIVO, HDMI/HDCP, no LVDS
AMD 690G chipset	RS690	Feb 2007	Phenom, Athlon 64, Sempron	80	1000 (HT 2.0)	Radeon X1250 (400MHz)	No	SB600	DirectX 9.0, AVIVO, HDMI/HDCP
AMD M690V chipset	RS690MC	Feb 2007	Turion 64 X2, Athlon 64 X2 mobile	80	800 (HT 2.0)	Radeon X1200 (350 MHz)	No	SB600	DirectX 9.0, AVIVO, DVI, HDMI/HDCP, no LVDS, Powerplay 7.0
AMD M690 chipset	RS690M	Feb 2007	Turion 64 X2, Athlon 64 X2 mobile	80	800 (HT 2.0)	Radeon X1250 (350 MHz)	No	SB600	DirectX 9.0, AVIVO, DVI/HDCP, no HDMI, Powerplay 7.0
AMD M690E chipset	RS690T	Feb 2007	Athlon Neo, Mobile Sempron	80	800 (HT 2.0)	Radeon X1250 (350Mhz)	No	SB600	DirectX 9.0, AVIVO, 2× HDMI/HDCP, Powerplay 7.0
AMD M690T chipset	RS690T	Feb 2007	Turion 64 X2, Athlon 64 X2 mobile	80	800 (HT 2.0)	Radeon X1270 (400Mhz)	No	SB600	DirectX 9.0, AVIVO, HDMI/HDCP, Powerplay 7.0
AMD 740 chipset	RX740	2008	Athlon 64, Phenom, Sempron	55	1000 (HT 2.0)	No	No	SB600, SB700, SB750	Single PCIe 1.1 x16
AMD 740G chipset	RS740	2008	Athlon 64, Phenom, Sempron	55	1000 (HT 2.0)	Radeon 2100	No	SB600, SB700, SB750	DirectX 9.0, AVIVO, HDMI/HDCP, OR single PCIe 1.1 x16
AMD 760G chipset	RS780L	2009	Athlon 64, Phenom, Sempron	55	2600 (HT 3.0)	Radeon 3000	Hybrid	SB710	DirectX 10, AVIVO HD, HDMI/HDCP, OR single PCIe 2.0 x16
AMD 770 chipset	RX780	2008	Athlon 64, Phenom, Sempron	65	2600 (HT 3.0)	No	No	SB600, SB700, SB710, SB750	Single PCIe 2.0 x16
AMD 780V chipset	RS780C	2008	Athlon 64, Phenom, Sempron	55	2600 (HT 3.0)	Radeon 3100	No	SB700, SB710, SB750	DirectX 10, AVIVO HD, HDMI/HDCP, DisplayPort/DPCP, OR single PCIe 2.0 x16
AMD 780G chipset	RS780I	2008	Athlon 64, Phenom, Sempron	55	2600 (HT 3.0)	Radeon HD 3200	Hybrid	SB700, SB710, SB750	DirectX 10, UVD+, HDMI/HDCP, DisplayPort/DPCP, Side-port memory, OR single PCIe 2.0 x16
AMD M780V chipset	RS780MC	2008	Mobile Turion, Mobile Athlon, Athlon Neo	55	2600 (HT 3.0)	Radeon 3100	PowerXpress; AXIOM/MXM module(s)	SB600, SB700, SB710	DirectX 10, UVD+, HDMI/HDCP, DisplayPort, DVI, VGA, OR single PCIe 2.0 x16 Puma Platform, PowerXpress
AMD M780G chipset	RS780M	2008	Mobile Turion, Mobile Athlon, Athlon Neo	55	2600 (HT 3.0)	Radeon HD 3200	PowerXpress; AXIOM/MXM module(s)	SB600, SB700, SB710	DirectX 10, UVD+, HDMI/HDCP, DisplayPort, DVI, VGA, OR single PCIe 2.0 x16 Puma Platform, PowerXpress
AMD 785G chipset	RS880	2009	Athlon 64, Phenom, Sempron	55	2600 (HT 3.0)	Radeon HD 4200	Hybrid, x16 + x4	SB710, SB750, SB810, SB850	DirectX 10.1, UVD2, Side-port memory, HDMI/HDCP, DisplayPort/DPCP, OR two PCIe 2.0 x16 TDP: 11 W (500 MHz), 3 W in PowerPlay
785E	RS785E	?		55	2200 (HT 3.0)	Radeon HD 4200	Hybrid	SB810, SB850, SB820M	
AMD 790GX chipset	RS780D	2008	Athlon 64, Phenom, Sempron	55	2600 (HT 3.0)	Radeon HD 3300	Hybrid, x8 + x8	SB750	DirectX 10, UVD+, Side-port memory, HDMI/HDCP, DisplayPort/DPCP, OR two PCIe 2.0 x16
AMD 790X chipset	RD780	2008	Athlon 64, Phenom, Sempron	65	2600 (HT 3.0)	No	x8 + x8	SB600, SB700, SB750, SB850	Two PCIe 2.0 x16
AMD 790FX chipset	RD790	Nov 2007	Athlon 64, Phenom, Sempron	65	2600 (HT 3.0)	No	CrossFire X (dual x16 or quad x8)	SB600, SB750, SB850	Up to four PCIe 2.0 x16 Support for AMD Quad FX platform (FASN8), Dual socket enthusiast platform with NUMA, optional single socket variant, 720-pin 1.1 V FC-BGA
Model	Codename	Released	CPU support	Fab (nm)	HT (MHz)	IGP	CrossFire	Southbridge	Features / notes

==== A-Link Express III ====
A-Link Express III is essentially PCIe 2.0 x4 lanes.

Model	Code name	Released	CPU support	Fab (nm)	HT (MHz)	AMD-V (Hardware Virtualization)	IGP	CrossFire	SLI	TDP (W)	Southbridge	Features / notes
AMD 870 chipset	RX880	2010	Phenom II, Athlon 64, Sempron	65	2600 (HT 3.0)	?	No	Hybrid, x16 + x4	No	?	SB850	Single PCIe 2.0 x16
AMD 880G chipset	RS880P	Q4 2010	Phenom II, Athlon II, Sempron	55	2600 (HT 3.0)	?	Radeon HD 4250	Hybrid	No	?	SB710, SB750, SB810, SB850, SB920, SB950	DirectX 10.1, UVD2, HDMI/HDCP, DisplayPort/DPCP, OR single PCIe 2.0 x16 AM3+ socket support
AMD 880M chipset	RS880M	Q2 2010	Mobile Turion II, Mobile Athlon II, Mobile Sempron	55	2600 (HT 3.0)	?	Radeon HD 4200	PowerXpress; AXIOM/MXM module(s)	No	?	SB820	DirectX 10.1, UVD2, HDMI/HDCP, DisplayPort, DVI, VGA, sideport memory, OR single PCI-E 2.0 x16 Mobile Chipset, Tigris platform
AMD 880M chipset	RS880M	Q2 2010	Athlon II Neo, Turion II Neo	55	2600 (HT 3.0)	?	Radeon HD 4225	PowerXpress; AXIOM/MXM module(s)	No	?	SB820	DirectX 10.1, UVD2, HDMI/HDCP, DisplayPort, DVI, VGA, OR Single PCI-E 2.0 x16 Mobile Chipset, Nile platform
AMD 880M chipset	RS880M	Q2 2010	Mobile Phenom II, Mobile Turion II, Mobile Athlon II, Mobile Sempron; V-Series	55	2600 (HT 3.0)	?	Radeon HD 4250; Radeon HD 4270	PowerXpress; AXIOM/MXM module(s)	No	?	SB820	DirectX 10.1, UVD2, HDMI/HDCP, DisplayPort, DVI, VGA, OR single PCI-E 2.0 x16 Mobile Chipset, Danube platform
AMD 890GX chipset	RS880D	Q2 2010	Phenom II, Athlon II, Sempron	55	2600 (HT 3.0)	?	Radeon HD 4290	Hybrid, x8 + x8	No	22	SB710, SB750, SB810, SB850	DirectX 10.1, UVD2, HDMI/HDCP, DisplayPort/DPCP, Side-port memory, OR two PCIe 2.0 x16
AMD 890FX chipset	RD890	Q2 2010	Bulldozer, Phenom II, Athlon II, Sempron	65	2600 (HT 3.0)	Yes	No	x16 + x16 or x8 quad	No	18	SB710, SB750, SB810, SB850	Four PCIe 2.0 x16, IOMMU
AMD 970 chipset	RX980	Q2 2011	Bulldozer, Piledriver; Phenom II, Athlon II, Sempron, FX	65	2400 (HT 3.0)	Yes	No	x16 + x4	No	13.6	SB710, SB750, SB810, SB850, SB920, SB950	Single PCIe 2.0 x16, IOMMU AM3+ socket support
AMD 990X chipset	RD980	Q2 2011	Bulldozer, Piledriver; Phenom II, Athlon II, Sempron, FX	65	2600 (HT 3.0)	Yes	No	x8 + x8	x8 + x8	14	SB710, SB750, SB810, SB850, SB920, SB950	Two PCIe 2.0 x16, IOMMU AM3+ socket support
AMD 990FX chipset	RD990	Q2 2011	Bulldozer, Piledriver; Phenom II, Athlon II, Sempron, FX	65	2600 (HT 3.0)	Yes	No	x16 + x16 or x8 quad	x16 + x16 or x16 + x8 + x8 or x8 quad	19.6	SB710, SB750, SB810, SB850, SB920, SB950	Four PCIe 2.0 x16, IOMMU AM3+ socket support
Model	Code name	Released	CPU support	Fab (nm)	HT (MHz)	AMD-V (Hardware Virtualization)	IGP	CrossFire	SLI	TDP (W)	Southbridge	Features / notes

=== Southbridges ===
==== AMD-xxx ====
Model	Codename	Released	Fab (nm)	USB 2.0 + 1.1	Audio	Parallel ATA^{1}	Features / notes
AMD 640 chipset	AMD-645	1997				2 × ATA/33	
AMD 750 chipset	AMD-756	1999		0 + 4		2 × ATA/66	
AMD 760 chipset	AMD-766	2001		0 + 4		2 × ATA/100	
AMD 760MPX chipset	AMD-768	2001		0 + 4	AC'97	2 × ATA/100	
Geode GX1	Geode CS5530				AC'97	2 × ATA/33	National Semiconductor release
Geode GXm Geode GXLV	Geode CS5530A				AC'97	2 × ATA/33	National Semiconductor release
Geode GX	Geode CS5535			0 + 4	AC'97	2 × ATA/66	
Geode LX	Geode CS5536			4 + 0	AC'97	2 × ATA/100	
AMD-8111 nForce Professional ULi-1563	AMD-8131	2004		4 + 2	AC'97	2 × ATA/133	PCI-X
AMD-8111 nForce Professional ULi-1563	AMD-8132	2004		4 + 2	AC'97	2 × ATA/133	PCI-X 2.0
AMD-8151	AMD-8151	2004		4 + 2	AC'97	2 × ATA/133	AGP 8X

^{1} Parallel ATA, also known as Enhanced IDE supports up to 2 devices per channel.

==== A-Link Express ====
- All models support eSATA implementations of available SATA channels.

Model	Codename	Released	Fab (nm)	SATA	USB 2.0 + 1.1	Parallel ATA^{1}	RAID	NIC	Package	TDP (W)	Features / notes
AMD 480/570/580/690 CrossFire Chipset	SB600	2006	130	4 × 3 Gbit/s; AHCI 1.1 SATA Revision 2.0	10 + 0	1 × ATA/133	0,1,10	No	548-pin FC-BGA	4.0	
AMD 700 chipset series	SB700	Q1 2008	130	6 × 3 Gbit/s; AHCI 1.1 SATA Revision 2.0	12 + 2	1 × ATA/133	0,1,10	No	548-pin FC-BGA	4.5	DASH 1.0
AMD 700 chipset series	SB700S	Q1 2008	130	6 × 3 Gbit/s; AHCI 1.1 SATA Revision 2.0	12 + 2	1 × ATA/133	0,1,10	No	548-pin FC-BGA	4.5	DASH 1.0; Server southbridge
AMD 700 chipset series	SB710	Q4 2008	130	6 × 3 Gbit/s; AHCI 1.1 SATA Revision 2.0	12 + 2	1 × ATA/133	0,1,10	No	548-pin FC-BGA	4.5	DASH 1.0
AMD 700 chipset series	SB750	Q4 2008	130	6 × 3 Gbit/s; AHCI 1.1 SATA Revision 2.0	12 + 2	1 × ATA/133	0,1,5,10	No	548-pin FC-BGA	4.5	DASH 1.0
AMD 800 chipset series	SB810	Q1 2010	65	6 × 3 Gbit/s; AHCI 1.2 SATA Revision 2.0	14 + 2	No	0,1,10	10/100/1000	605-pin FC-BGA	6.0	
AMD 800 chipset series	SB850	Q1 2010	65	6 × 6 Gbit/s; AHCI 1.2 SATA Revision 3.0	14 + 2	No	0,1,5,10	10/100/1000	605-pin FC-BGA	6.0	
AMD 800 chipset series	SB820M		65	6 × 6 Gbit/s; AHCI 1.2 SATA Revision 3.0	14 + 2	No	0,1	10/100/1000	605-pin FC-BGA	3.4–5.3	mobile/embedded
AMD 900 chipset series	SB920	May 30, 2011	65	6 × 6 Gbit/s; AHCI 1.2 SATA Revision 3.0	14 + 2	No	0,1,10	10/100/1000	605-pin FC-BGA	6.0	
AMD 900 chipset series	SB950	May 30, 2011	65	6 × 6 Gbit/s; AHCI 1.2 SATA Revision 3.0	14 + 2	No	0,1,5,10	10/100/1000	605-pin FC-BGA	6.0	
Model	Codename	Released	Fab (nm)	SATA	USB 2.0 + 1.1	Parallel ATA^{1}	RAID	NIC	Package	TDP (W)	Features / notes

^{1} Parallel ATA, also known as Enhanced IDE supports up to 2 devices per channel.

== Fusion controller hubs (FCH) ==
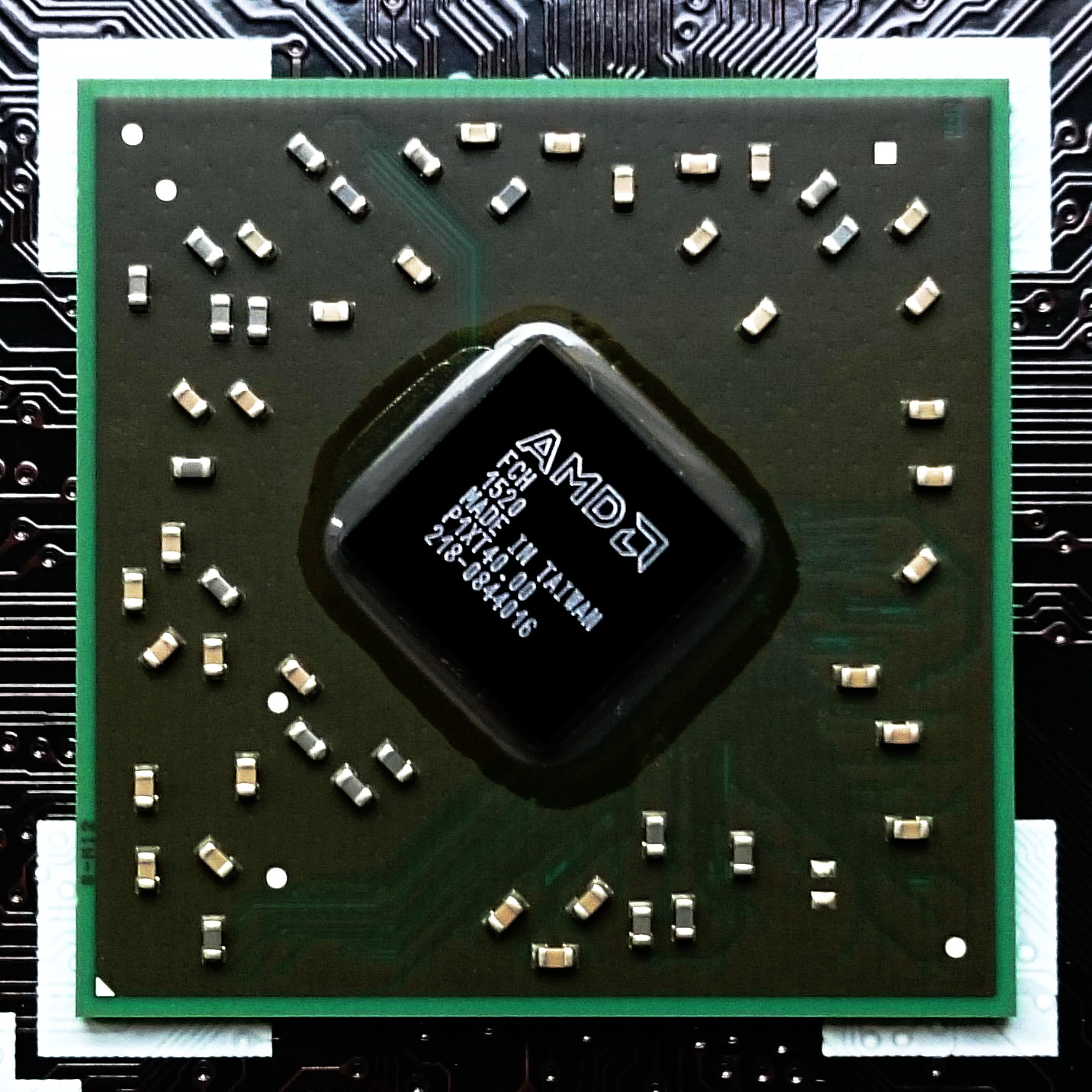
Fusion Controller Hub A88X

For AMD APU models from 2011 until 2016. AMD marketed their chipsets as Fusion Controller Hubs (FCH), implementing it across their product range in 2017 alongside the release of the Zen architecture. Before then, only APUs used FCHs, while their other CPUs still used a northbridge and southbridge. The Fusion Controller Hubs are similar in function to Intel's Platform Controller Hub. It communicates with the CPU using the UMI interface.

Model	Codename	UMI	SATA	USB 3.0+2.0+1.1	RAID	NIC	33 MHz PCI	SD (Note: Supports SDHC up to 32 GB, 4 pins @ 50 MHz.)	VGA DAC	TDP (W)	Features / notes	Part number
Mobile
A55T	Hudson-M2T (Note: M: for notebook platform)	×2 Gen 1	1× 3 Gbit/s; AHCI 1.1	0 + 8 + 0	No	No	No	SDIO	No			
A50M	Hudson-M1	×4 Gen 1 (Note: UMI ×4 Gen. 1 is based on PCIe 1.1 × 4 lanes, giving 1 GB/s bandwidth)	6× 6 Gbit/s; AHCI 1.2	0 + 14 + 2	No	No	No	No	No	5.9	~920 mW idle	100-CG2198
A60M	Hudson-M2	×4 Gen 1 +DP	6× 6 Gbit/s; AHCI 1.2	0 + 14 + 2	0,1	10/100/1000	No	Yes	Yes	4.7		
A68M	Hudson-M3L	×4 Gen 1 +DP	2× 6 Gbit/s; AHCI 1.2	2 + 8 + 0	0,1	10/100/1000	No	Yes	No	4.7	~750 mW idle	218-0792006
A70M	Hudson-M3	×4 Gen 1 +DP	6× 6 Gbit/s; AHCI 1.2	4 + 10 + 2	0,1	10/100/1000	No	Yes	Yes	4.7	First native USB 3.0 controller	100-CG2389
A76M	Bolton-M3											218-0844012
Desktop
A45	Hudson-D1 (Note: D: for desktop platform)	×4 Gen. 2 (Note: UMI ×4 Gen. 2 is based on PCIe 2.0 × 4 lanes, giving 2 GB/s bandwidth)	6× 3 Gbit/s; AHCI 1.1	0 + 14 + 2	No	No	Up to 4 slots	No	No			218-0792008
A55	Hudson-D2	×4 Gen 2 +DP	6× 3 Gbit/s; AHCI 1.1	0 + 14 + 2	0,1,10	10/100/1000	Up to 3 slots	Yes	Yes	7.6		
A58	Bolton-D2	×4 Gen 2	6× 3 Gbit/s; AHCI 1.3	0 + 14 + 2	0,1,10		Up to 3 slots	Yes	Yes	7.6		218-0844023
A68H	Bolton-D2H	×4 Gen 2	4× 6 Gbit/s; AHCI 1.3	2 + 10 + 2	0,1,10		Up to 3 slots	Yes	Yes		xHCI 1.0	218-0844029-00
A75	Hudson-D3	×4 Gen 2 +DP	6× 6 Gbit/s; AHCI 1.2	4 + 10 + 2	0,1,10	10/100/1000	Up to 3 slots	Yes	Yes	7.8	First native USB 3.0 controller	100-CG2386
A78	Bolton-D3	×4 Gen 2 +DP	6× 6 Gbit/s; AHCI 1.3	4 + 10 + 2	0,1,10		Up to 3 slots	Yes	Yes	7.8	xHCI 1.0	218-0844014
A85X	Hudson-D4	×4 Gen 2 +DP	8× 6 Gbit/s; AHCI 1.2	4 + 10 + 2	0,1,5,10	10/100/1000	Up to 3 slots	Yes	Yes	7.8	USB 3.0 (xHCI 0.96)	218-0755117
A88X	Bolton-D4	×4 Gen 2	8× 6 Gbit/s; AHCI 1.3	4 + 10 + 2	0,1,5,10		Up to 3 slots	Yes	Yes	7.8	USB 3.0 (xHCI 1.0)	218-0844016
Embedded
A55E	Hudson-E1 (Note: E: for embedded platform)	×4 Gen 2	6× 6 Gbit/s; AHCI 1.2	0 + 14 + 2	0,1,5,10	10/100/1000	Up to 4 slots	No	No	5.9		100-CG2293
A77E	Bolton-E4	1-, 2-, or 4-lane 2 or 5 GB/s	6× 6 Gbit/s; AHCI 1.3	4 + 10 + 2			Up to 3 slots	Yes	Yes		4-lane PCIe 2.0	218-0844020-00
Model	Codename	UMI	SATA	USB 3.0+2.0+1.1	RAID	NIC	33 MHz PCI	SD	VGA DAC	TDP (W)	Features / notes	Part number

Secure Digital:

Codename:

UMI:

== Switch to SoC ==
AMD's FCH has been discontinued since the release of the Carrizo (2015, AM4) series of CPUs as it has been integrated into the same die as the rest of the CPU. What is known as the "chipset" is instead a special PCIe device that combines the functionalities of a PCIe switch (which expands the number of available PCIe lanes), a USB host, and/or a SATA host. This device connects to the CPU via a dedicated PCIe link.

Technically the processor can operate without a chipset; it only continues to be present for interfacing with low speed I/O devices. AMD server CPUs adopt a self contained system on chip design instead which doesn't require a chipset.

PCIe-based AMD chipsets have been repurposed as PCIe add-in cards: the AsRock "X670 Xpansion Kit" uses an additional B650 chipset to convert the AsRock B650 LiveMixer into an X670. An open-source "B650 Southbridge Expansion Card" also uses a B650 chip (single Promontory 21) and provides additional M.2, SATA, and USB ports. It works on both Intel and AMD platforms.

== AM4 chipsets ==
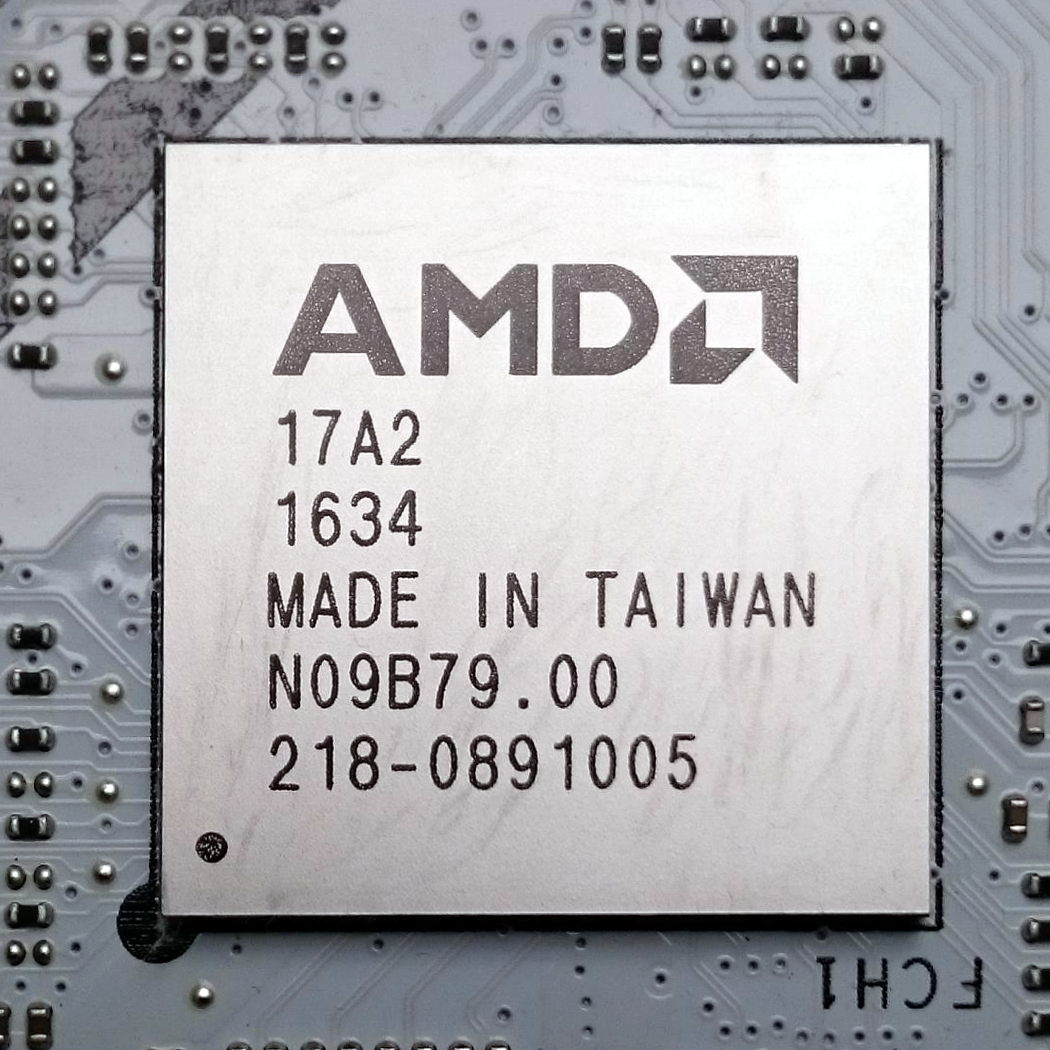
AMD B350 Chipset

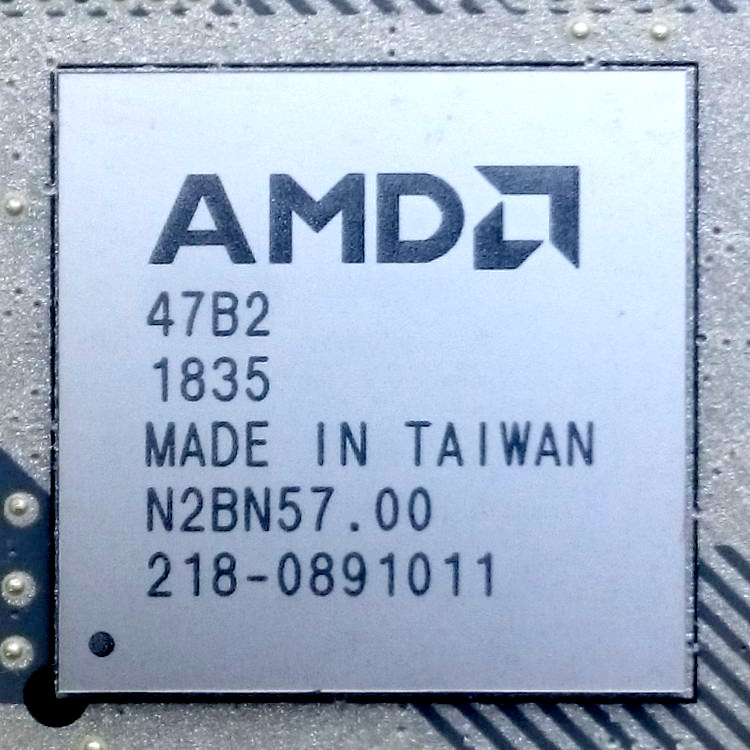
AMD B450 Chipset

A total of 3 generations of AM4-based chipsets has been released. These generations begin the numeric part of their models with 3, 4 and 5, respectively.

In addition to their traditional chipsets, AMD offers chipsets with "processor-direct access", exclusively through OEM partners. Enthusiast publication igor'sLAB obtained leaked documents about an AMD "Knoll Activator" that enables "activating... processor I/O and processor features in the absence of an alternative AMD chipset." It is concluded that motherboards with the Knoll Activator would be built with I/O from the processor and low-cost I/O chips.

Individual chipset models differ in the number of PCI Express lanes, USB ports, and SATA connectors, as well as supported technologies; the table below shows these differences.

Model	Release date	PCIe support (Note: PCIe lanes provided by the chipset. The CPU provides other PCIe 3.0 or 4.0 lanes.)	Multi-GPU		USB support (Note: USB 3.2 Gen 2x1 10Gb/s, USB 3.2 Gen 1x1 5Gb/s, USB 2.0)	Storage features			Processor overclocking	TDP	CPU support					ECC memory	Architecture	Part number
Model	Release date	PCIe support	CrossFire	SLI	USB support	SATA ports	RAID	AMD StoreMI	Processor overclocking	TDP	Excavator	Zen	Zen+	Zen 2	Zen 3	ECC memory	Architecture	Part number
A300	Feb 2017	None	N/A		None	None	Yes	No	No	~120 μW (Note: Knoll chipsets consume "insignificant power ...after [boot] in sleep mode", power figure based on a typical SPI controller)	No	Yes				No	Knoll Express	100-CG2978 218-0892000 KNOLL1
X300	Feb 2017	None	N/A		None	None	Yes	No	Yes	~120 μW	No	Yes				No	Knoll Express	unknown
Pro 500	Jan 2020	None	N/A		None	None	Unknown		No	~120 μW	No	Partial (Note: Limited to specific SKUs branded as Ryzen Pro and Athlon Pro)				No	Knoll Express	218-0891003 unreleased
A320	Feb 2017	PCIe 2.0 ×4	No	No	1, 2, 6	4	0, 1, 10	No	Limited (Note: Only pre-Zen CPUs can be overclocked.)	~5.8 W	Yes	Yes	Yes	Varies (Note: BIOS update needed. Availability may depend on manufacturer.)		No	Promontory	218-0891004
B350	Feb 2017	PCIe 2.0 ×6	Yes	No	2, 2, 6	4	0, 1, 10	No	Yes	~5.8 W	Yes	Yes	Yes	Varies		No	Promontory	218-0891005
X370	Feb 2017	PCIe 2.0 ×8	Yes	Yes	2, 6, 6	8	0, 1, 10	No	Yes	~5.8 W	Yes	Yes	Yes	Varies		No	Promontory	218-0891006
B450	Mar 2018	PCIe 2.0 ×6	Yes	No	2, 2, 6	4	0, 1, 10	Yes	Yes, with PBO	~5.8 W	Varies (Note: Beta BIOS updates may be made available by motherboard manufacturers.)	Yes	Yes	Yes	Varies	No	Promontory	218-0891011
X470	Mar 2018	PCIe 2.0 ×8	Yes	Yes	2, 6, 6	8	0, 1, 10	Yes	Yes, with PBO	~5.8 W	Varies	Yes	Yes	Yes	Varies	No	Promontory	218-0891008
A520	Aug 2020	PCIe 3.0 ×6	No		1, 2, 6	4	0, 1, 10	Yes	No	~5.8 W	Varies	Varies	Yes	Yes	Varies	No	Promontory	218-0891015
B550 (Note: OEM-only B550A is a rebranded B450)	Jun 2020	PCIe 3.0 ×10	Yes	Varies	2, 2, 6	6	0, 1, 10	Yes	Yes, with PBO	~7W	Varies	Varies	Yes	Yes	Varies	UDIMM (Note: No guarantees, it depends on the motherboard and CPU)	Promontory	218-0891014 - b550, 218-0891009 - B550A
X570	Jul 2019	PCIe 4.0 ×16	Yes	Yes	8, 0, 4	12	0, 1, 10	Yes	Yes, with PBO	~15 W (Note: 7 watts on passive cooling (termed X570s).)	No	Yes	Yes	Yes	Yes	UDIMM	Bixby	100-CG3091

The 300 series, 400 series, and the B550 chipsets are designed in collaboration with ASMedia and the family is codenamed Promontory. The X570 is designed by AMD with IP licensed from ASMedia and other companies and is codenamed Bixby. Network interface controller, Wi-Fi, and Bluetooth are provided by external chips connected to the chipset through PCIe or USB. All 300 series chipsets are made using 55 nm lithography. The X570 chipset is a repurposed Matisse/Vermeer IO die made using a 14 nm process.

== TR4 chipsets ==
Supports both 1st and 2nd generation AMD Ryzen Threadripper processors.

Model	CPU PCIe Link	PCIe support	Multi-GPU support		SATA + SATA Express	USB 3.1 Gen 2 + 3.1 Gen 1 + 2.0	RAID	Overclocking	TDP	Chipset lithography	ECC memory
Model	CPU PCIe Link	PCIe support	CrossFire	SLI	SATA + SATA Express	USB 3.1 Gen 2 + 3.1 Gen 1 + 2.0	RAID	Overclocking	TDP	Chipset lithography	ECC memory
X399	×4	PCIe 2.0 ×8	Yes	Yes	4 + 2	2 + 14 + 6	0,1,10	Yes	5 W	Unknown	UDIMM

== sTRX4 chipsets ==
Supports 3rd generation AMD Ryzen Threadripper (3960X to 3990X) processors.

Model	CPU PCIe Link	PCIe support	Multi-GPU support		SATA	USB 3.1 Gen 2 + 2.0	RAID	Overclocking	TDP	Chipset lithography	ECC memory	Notes
Model	CPU PCIe Link	PCIe support	CrossFire	SLI	SATA	USB 3.1 Gen 2 + 2.0	RAID	Overclocking	TDP	Chipset lithography	ECC memory	Notes
TRX40	×8	PCIe 4.0 ×8	Yes	Yes	4 (+ up to 2 × 4 extra)	8 + 4	0,1,10	Yes	15 W	14 nm	UDIMM	HW-wise identical to X570

Although the X399, TRX40 and WRX80 motherboards' CPU sockets use the same number of pins, the sockets are incompatible with each other due to ID pins and no-connects of some pins. Twelve TRX40 motherboards were released at launch in November 2019. The TRX40 chipset does not support the HD Audio interface on its own, so motherboard vendors must include a USB audio device or a PCIe audio device on TRX40 motherboards to integrate audio codecs.

== sWRX8 chipsets ==
Supports 3rd (3900WX) and 4th generation (5900WX) AMD Ryzen Threadripper Pro processors.

Model	CPU PCIe Link	PCIe support	Multi-GPU support		SATA	USB 3.1 Gen 2 + 2.0	RAID	Overclocking	TDP	Chipset lithography	ECC memory	Notes
Model	CPU PCIe Link	PCIe support	CrossFire	SLI	SATA	USB 3.1 Gen 2 + 2.0	RAID	Overclocking	TDP	Chipset lithography	ECC memory	Notes
WRX80	×8	PCIe 4.0 ×16	Yes	Yes	4	8 + 4	0,1,10	Yes	15 W	14 nm	RDIMM	HW-wise identical to EPYC/Threadripper IO die

Although the X399, TRX40 and WRX80 motherboards' CPU sockets use the same number of pins, the sockets are incompatible with each other due to ID pins and no-connects of some pins. Three WRX80 motherboards were released at launch in March 2021. The WRX80 chipset does not support the HD Audio interface on its own, so motherboard vendors must include a USB audio device or a PCIe audio device on WRX80 motherboards to integrate audio codecs.

== AM5 chipsets ==
AMD uses a single Promontory 21 chipset for all configurations that include a chipset. A single Promontory 21 chip provides four SATA III ports and twelve PCIe 4.0 lanes. Four lanes are reserved for the chipset uplink to the CPU while another four are used to connect to another Promontory 21 chip in a daisy-chained topology for X670, X670E and X870E chipsets. AM5 chipsets are still designed by ASMedia, and include greatly improved peripherals stability (such as USB and PCIe).

			A620 / A620A	B650	B650E	X670	X670E	B840	B850	X870	X870E
Processor features support	CPU support	Zen 4	Yes								
Processor features support	CPU support	Zen 5	Yes (Note: A BIOS update is more likely to be needed if the motherboard was manufactured at an earlier date.)					Yes			
Processor features support	CPU overclocking		No	Yes				No	Yes		
Processor features support	PCIe 5.0 support (Note: Support for Gen5 speeds on lanes directly from CPU to expansion and M.2 slots, and general-purpose lanes. (Also depends on CPU PCIe support. Some CPUs have as low as 10 lanes of PCIe 4.0 available.))	x16 slot	No	No	Yes	No	Yes	No	Optional	Yes	
Processor features support	PCIe 5.0 support	M.2 slot (Note: The "first" M.2 slot.) + 4× GPP (Note: Some motherboards connect GPP lanes to a second M.2 slot.)	No	M.2: Optional	Yes			No	M.2: Yes	Yes	
Processor features support	PCIe 5.0 support	M.2 slot + 4× GPP	No	GPP: No	Yes			No	GPP: No	Yes	
Processor features support	PCIe 4.0 support (Note: Per AMD specifications, these PCIe 4.0 lanes are allocated for the primary GPU slot as a fallback when PCIe 5.0 is unavailable. PCIe bifurcation is supported per spec, but actual availability depends on the motherboard manufacturer's implementation.)		1x16	1x16 or 2x8	No	1x16 or 2x8	No	1x16	1x16 or 2x8	No	
Processor features support	USB ports	USB 3.2 Gen 2x1	4								
Chipset features	ECC memory		UDIMM (Note: No guarantees, it depends on the motherboard and CPU)								
Chipset features	PCIe lanes (Note: PCIe lanes provided by the chipset. The CPU provides other PCIe 5.0 and/or 4.0 lanes.)	Gen 4	None	×8		×12		None	×8		×12
Chipset features	PCIe lanes	Gen 3	Up to ×8	Up to ×4		Up to ×8		Up to ×10	Up to x4		Up to ×8
Chipset features	USB ports	USB 2.0	6			12		6			12
Chipset features	USB ports	USB 3.2 Gen 1x1 (5 Gb/s)	2	None				2	None		
Chipset features	USB ports	USB 3.2 Gen 2x1 (10 Gb/s)	2	with max x2 ports: 4 without x2 ports: 6 (Note: The motherboard maker may configure the total of 6 USB 3.2 lanes provided by the chipset into "4× USB3.2 Gen 2x1 and 1× USB3.2 Gen 2x2" or "6× USB3.2 Gen 2x1 and 0× USB3.2 Gen 2x2" ports.)		with max x2 ports: 8 without x2 ports: 12 (Note: The motherboard maker may configure the total of 12 USB 3.2 lanes provided by the chipset into one of the following: "8× USB3.2 Gen 2x1 and 2× USB3.2 Gen 2x2", "10× USB3.2 Gen 2x1 and 1× USB3.2 Gen 2x2", or "12× USB3.2 Gen 2x1 and 0× USB3.2 Gen 2x2")		2	with max x2 ports: 4 without x2 ports: 6		with max x2 ports: 8 without x2 ports: 12
Chipset features	USB ports	USB 3.2 Gen 2x2 (20 Gb/s)	None	Up to 1		Up to 2		None	Up to 1		Up to 2
Chipset features	Storage features	SATA III ports	Up to 4			Up to 8		Up to 4			Up to 8
Chipset features	Storage features	RAID	0, 1, 10								
Platform features	USB4 Gen 3×2 (40 Gb/s) (Note: Provided by a third-party controller.)		Optional							Yes	
Platform features	Wi-Fi		Optional (Note: AMD did not mandate which Wi-Fi version should be paired with which chipset (unlike USB4 is mandatory with some chipsets). Motherboard makers may omit Wi-Fi on some models.)								
Platform features	PCIe x16 slot configurations		1×16	1×16 or 2×8				1×16	1×16 or 2×8		
Platform features	Multi-GPU	CrossFire	No	Yes	Yes	Yes	Yes	No	?	Yes	Yes
Platform features	Multi-GPU	SLI	No								
Chipset links		To CPU	PCIe 4.0 ×4								
Chipset links		Interchipset	No			PCIe 4.0 ×4		No			PCIe 4.0 ×4
Chipset TDP			~4.5 W	~7 W		~14 W (Note: Two Promontory 21 chipsets are present, each having a TDP of ~7 W, giving a total TDP of ~14 W.)		?	~7 W		~14 W
Architecture			Promontory 22 / 21 x1 (A620); Promontory 19 x1 (A620A)	Promontory 21 ×1		Promontory 21 ×2		Promontory 19 ×1	Promontory 21 ×1		Promontory 21 ×2
Release date			Mar 31, 2023	Oct 10, 2022		Sep 27, 2022		Jan 6, 2025		Sep 2024	
References											
			A620 / A620A	B650	B650E	X670	X670E	B840	B850	X870	X870E

== sTR5 chipsets ==
The sTR5 socket has two chipset options available, TRX50 and WRX90:

- TRX50 is an HEDT (High-End Desk-Top) platform which is intended to be paired with Threadripper (7000X) series processors, but is also compatible with Threadripper Pro models. When a Threadripper Pro CPU is paired with a TRX50 motherboard, extra features like enterprise management and security won't be available to the user, and PCIe lanes and memory channels will still be limited to that of non-Pro Threadripper.
- WRX90 is a workstation platform for Threadripper Pro (7000WX) series processors. It is not compatible with the Threadripper non-Pro 7000X series.

HD audio support is provided by the CPU, rather than by the chipset.

Model	CPU PCIe Link	PCIe support	Multi-GPU support		SATA	USB 3.2 Gen 2x2 + 3.1 Gen 2 + 2.0	RAID	Overclocking	TDP	Chipset lithography	ECC memory	Notes
Model	CPU PCIe Link	PCIe support	CrossFire	SLI	SATA	USB 3.2 Gen 2x2 + 3.1 Gen 2 + 2.0	RAID	Overclocking	TDP	Chipset lithography	ECC memory	Notes
TRX50		PCIe 4.0 ×8			4	1 + 4 + 4		Yes			RDIMM	
WRX90	×4	PCIe 4.0 ×8			4	1 + 4 + 4		Yes			RDIMM	

== See also ==
- List of AMD graphics processing units
- List of AMD microprocessors
- List of AMD processors with 3D graphics
- List of Intel chipsets
