= List of AMD Turion processors =

Turion 64 is a family of CPUs designed by AMD for the mobile computing market.

== Single-core mobile processors ==
=== Turion 64 ===
==== "Lancaster" (90 nm) ====
- All models support: MMX, SSE, SSE2, SSE3, Enhanced 3DNow!, NX bit, AMD64, PowerNow!

Model number	Frequency	L2 cache	HT	Multi (Note: For traditional processors, the multiplier is the value multiplied by the speed of the FSB to get the clock speed of the processor. Turion processors have a memory controller integrated on the CPU die, replacing the traditional concept of FSB. The multiplier here applies to the 200 MHz system clock frequency, not the HyperTransport speed.)	Voltage	TDP	Socket	Release date	Order part number
Turion 64 ML-28	1600 MHz	512 KB	800 MHz	8x	1.35	35 W	Socket 754	June 22, 2005	TMDML28BKX4LD
Turion 64 ML-30	1600 MHz	1024 KB	800 MHz	8x	1.35	35 W	Socket 754	March 10, 2005	TMDML30BKX5LD
Turion 64 ML-32	1800 MHz	512 KB	800 MHz	9x	1.35	35 W	Socket 754	March 10, 2005	TMDML32BKX4LD
Turion 64 ML-34	1800 MHz	1024 KB	800 MHz	9x	1.35	35 W	Socket 754	March 10, 2005	TMDML34BKX5LD
Turion 64 ML-37	2000 MHz	1024 KB	800 MHz	10x	1.35	35 W	Socket 754	March 10, 2005	TMDML37BKX5LD
Turion 64 ML-40	2200 MHz	1024 KB	800 MHz	11x	1.35	35 W	Socket 754	June 22, 2005	TMDML40BKX5LD
Turion 64 ML-42	2400 MHz	512 KB	800 MHz	12x	1.35	35 W	Socket 754	October 4, 2005	TMDML42BKX4LD
Turion 64 ML-44	2400 MHz	1024 KB	800 MHz	12x	1.35	35 W	Socket 754	January 4, 2006	TMDML44BKX5LD
Turion 64 MT-28	1600 MHz	512 KB	800 MHz	8x	1.2	25 W	Socket 754	June 22, 2005	TMSMT28BQX4LD
Turion 64 MT-30	1600 MHz	1024 KB	800 MHz	8x	1.2	25 W	Socket 754	March 10, 2005	TMSMT30BQX5LD
Turion 64 MT-32	1800 MHz	512 KB	800 MHz	9x	1.2	25 W	Socket 754	March 10, 2005	TMSMT32BQX4LD
Turion 64 MT-34	1800 MHz	1024 KB	800 MHz	9x	1.2	25 W	Socket 754	March 10, 2005	TMSMT34BQX5LD
Turion 64 MT-37	2000 MHz	1024 KB	800 MHz	10x	1.2	25 W	Socket 754	August 8, 2005	TMSMT37BQX5LD
Turion 64 MT-40	2200 MHz	1024 KB	800 MHz	11x	1.2	25 W	Socket 754	August 8, 2005	TMSMT40BQX5LD

==== "Richmond" (90 nm) ====
- All models support: MMX, SSE, SSE2, SSE3, Enhanced 3DNow!, NX bit, AMD64, PowerNow!, AMD-V

Model number	Frequency	L2 cache	HT	Multi	Voltage	TDP	Socket	Release date	Order part number
Turion 64 MK-36	2000 MHz	512 KB	800 MHz	10x	1.15	31 W	Socket S1g1	September 1, 2006	TMDMK36HAX4CM
Turion 64 MK-38	2200 MHz	512 KB	800 MHz	11x	1.15	31 W	Socket S1g1	Q1 2007	TMDMK38HAX4CM

=== Sempron (Turion 64-based) ===
==== "Sable" (65 nm) ====
- All models support: MMX, SSE, SSE2, SSE3, Enhanced 3DNow!, NX bit, AMD64, PowerNow!

Model number	Frequency	L2 cache	HT	Multi	Voltage	TDP	Socket	Release date	Order part number
Sempron SI-40	2000 MHz	512 KB	1800 MHz	10x	1.075 - 1.125	25 W	Socket S1g2	June 4, 2008	SMSI40SAM12GG
Sempron SI-42	2100 MHz	512 KB	1800 MHz	10.5x	1.075 - 1.125	25 W	Socket S1g2	Q3 2008	SMSI42SAM12GG

=== Athlon (Turion 64-based) ===
==== "Sable" (65 nm) ====
- All models support: MMX, SSE, SSE2, SSE3, Enhanced 3DNow!, NX bit, AMD64, PowerNow!, AMD-V

Model number	Frequency	L2 cache	HT	Multi	Voltage	TDP	Socket	Release date	Order part number
Athlon QI-46	2100 MHz	512 KB	1800 MHz	10.5x		25 W	Socket S1g2		AMQI46SAM12GG

=== Sempron (Turion X2-based) ===
==== "Huron" (65 nm) ====
- All models support: MMX, SSE, SSE2, SSE3, Enhanced 3DNow!, NX bit, AMD64

Model number	Frequency	L2 cache	HT	Multi	Voltage	TDP	Socket	Release date	Order part number
Sempron 200U	1000 MHz	256 KB	800 MHz	5x	0.925	8 W	Socket ASB1	January 2009	SMF200UOAX3DV
Sempron 210U	1500 MHz	256 KB	800 MHz	7.5x	0.925	15 W	Socket ASB1	January 2009	SMG210UOAX3DX

=== Sempron (Turion II-based) ===
==== "Caspian" (45 nm) ====
- All models support: MMX, SSE, SSE2, SSE3, SSE4a, Enhanced 3DNow!, NX bit, AMD64, PowerNow!, AMD-V

Model number	Frequency	L2 cache	FPU width	HT	Multi	TDP	Socket	Release date	Order part number
Sempron M100	2000 MHz	512 KB	64-bit	1600 MHz	10x	25 W	Socket S1g3	September 10, 2009	SMM100SBO12GQ
Sempron M120	2100 MHz	512 KB	64-bit	1600 MHz	10.5x	25 W	Socket S1g3	September 10, 2009	SMM120SBO12GQ
Sempron M140	2200 MHz	512 KB	64-bit	1600 MHz	10.5x	25 W	Socket S1g3	April 2010	SMM140SBO12GQ

== Dual-core mobile processors ==
=== Turion 64 X2 ===
==== "Taylor" (90 nm) ====
- All models support: MMX, SSE, SSE2, SSE3, Enhanced 3DNow!, NX bit, AMD64, PowerNow!, AMD-V

Model number	Frequency	L2 cache	HT	Multi	Voltage	TDP	Socket	Release date	Order part number
Turion 64 X2 TL-50	1600 MHz	2 × 256 KB	800 MHz	8x	0.8 - 1.1	31 W	Socket S1g1	May 17, 2006	TMDTL50HAX4CT

==== "Trinidad" (90 nm) ====
- All models support: MMX, SSE, SSE2, SSE3, Enhanced 3DNow!, NX bit, AMD64, PowerNow!, AMD-V

Model number	Frequency	L2 cache	HT	Multi	Voltage	TDP	Socket	Release date	Order part number
Turion 64 X2 TL-52	1600 MHz	2 × 512 KB	800 MHz	8x	0.8-1.125	31 W	Socket S1g1	May 17, 2006	TMDTL52HAX5CT
Turion 64 X2 TL-56	1800 MHz	2 × 512 KB	800 MHz	9x	0.8-1.125	33 W	Socket S1g1	May 17, 2006	TMDTL56HAX5CT
Turion 64 X2 TL-60	2000 MHz	2 × 512 KB	800 MHz	10x	0.8-1.125	35 W	Socket S1g1	May 17, 2006	TMDTL60HAX5CT
Turion 64 X2 TL-64	2200 MHz	2 × 512 KB	800 MHz	11x	0.8-1.125	35 W	Socket S1g1	January 30, 2007	TMDTL64HAX5CT

=== Athlon 64 X2 ===
==== "Tyler" (65 nm) ====
- All models support: MMX, SSE, SSE2, SSE3, Enhanced 3DNow!, NX bit, AMD64, PowerNow!, AMD-V

Model Number	Frequency	L2-Cache	HT	Multiplier	Voltage	TDP	Socket	Release date	Order Part Number
Athlon 64 X2 TK-42	1600 MHz	2 x 512 KB	800 MHz	8x	1.075/1.10/1.125 V	20 W	Socket S1g1	2009	AMETK42HAX5DM
Athlon 64 X2 TK-53	1700 MHz	2 x 256 KB	800 MHz	8.5x	1.075/1.10/1.125 V	31 W	Socket S1g1	Aug 20, 2007	AMDTK53HAX4DC
Athlon 64 X2 TK-55	1800 MHz	2 x 256 KB	800 MHz	9x	1.075/1.10/1.125 V	31 W	Socket S1g1	Aug 20, 2007	AMDTK55HAX4DC
Athlon 64 X2 TK-57	1900 MHz	2 x 256 KB	800 MHz	9.5x	1.075/1.10/1.125 V	31 W	Socket S1g1	2008	AMDTK57HAX4DM

=== Turion 64 X2 ===
==== "Tyler" (65 nm) ====
- All models support: MMX, SSE, SSE2, SSE3, Enhanced 3DNow!, NX bit, AMD64, PowerNow!, AMD-V

Model Number	Frequency	L2-Cache	HT	Multiplier	Voltage	TDP	Socket	Release date	Order Part Number
Turion 64 X2 TL-56	1800 MHz	2 x 512 KB	800 MHz	9x	1.075/1.10/1.125 V	31 W	Socket S1g1	May 7, 2007	TMDTL56HAX5DC
Turion 64 X2 TL-56	1800 MHz	2 x 512 KB	800 MHz	9x	1.075/1.10/1.125 V	35 W	Socket S1g1	May 7, 2007	TMDTL56HAX5DM
Turion 64 X2 TL-58	1900 MHz	2 x 512 KB	800 MHz	9.5x	1.075/1.10/1.125 V	31 W	Socket S1g1	May 7, 2007	TMDTL58HAX5DC
Turion 64 X2 TL-58	1900 MHz	2 x 512 KB	800 MHz	9.5x	1.075/1.10/1.125 V	35 W	Socket S1g1	May 7, 2007	TMDTL58HAX5DM
Turion 64 X2 TL-60	2000 MHz	2 x 512 KB	800 MHz	10x	1.075/1.10/1.125 V	31 W	Socket S1g1	May 7, 2007	TMDTL60HAX5DC
Turion 64 X2 TL-60	2000 MHz	2 x 512 KB	800 MHz	10x	1.075/1.10/1.125 V	35 W	Socket S1g1	May 7, 2007	TMDTL60HAX5DM
Turion 64 X2 TL-62	2100 MHz	2 x 512 KB	800 MHz	10.5x	1.075/1.10/1.125 V	35 W	Socket S1g1	May 7, 2007	TMDTL62HAX5DM
Turion 64 X2 TL-64	2200 MHz	2 x 512 KB	800 MHz	11x	1.075/1.10/1.125 V	35 W	Socket S1g1	May 7, 2007	TMDTL64HAX5DC
Turion 64 X2 TL-64	2200 MHz	2 x 512 KB	800 MHz	11x	1.075/1.10/1.125 V	35 W	Socket S1g1	May 7, 2007	TMDTL64HAX5DM
Turion 64 X2 TL-66	2300 MHz	2 x 512 KB	800 MHz	11.5x	1.075/1.10/1.125 V	35 W	Socket S1g1	May 7, 2007	TMDTL66HAX5DC
Turion 64 X2 TL-66	2300 MHz	2 x 512 KB	800 MHz	11.5x	1.075/1.10/1.125 V	35 W	Socket S1g1	May 7, 2007	TMDTL66HAX5DM
Turion 64 X2 TL-68	2400 MHz	2 x 512 KB	800 MHz	12x	1.075/1.10/1.125 V	35 W	Socket S1g1	Dec 19, 2007	TMDTL68HAX5DM

=== Turion X2 / Turion X2 Ultra ===
==== "Lion" (65 nm) ====
- All models support: MMX, SSE, SSE2, SSE3, Enhanced 3DNow!, NX bit, AMD64, PowerNow!, AMD-V

Model number	Frequency	L2 cache	HT	Multi	Voltage	TDP	Socket	Release date	Order part number
Turion X2 Ultra ZM-80	2100 MHz	2 x 1 MB	1800 MHz	10.5x	0.75-1.2	32 W	Socket S1g2	June 4, 2008	TMZM80DAM23GG
Turion X2 Ultra ZM-82	2200 MHz	2 x 1 MB	1800 MHz	11x	0.75-1.2	35 W	Socket S1g2	June 4, 2008	TMZM82DAM23GG
Turion X2 Ultra ZM-84	2300 MHz	2 x 1 MB	1800 MHz	11.5x	0.75-1.2	35 W	Socket S1g2	Q3 2008	TMZM84DAM23GG
Turion X2 Ultra ZM-85	2300 MHz	2 x 1 MB	2200 MHz	11.5x	0.75-1.2	35 W	Socket S1g2	Q3 2008	TMZM85DAM23GG
Turion X2 Ultra ZM-86	2400 MHz	2 x 1 MB	1800 MHz	12x	0.75-1.2	35 W	Socket S1g2	June 4, 2008	TMZM86DAM23GG
Turion X2 Ultra ZM-87	2400 MHz	2 x 1 MB	2200 MHz	12x	0.75-1.2	35 W	Socket S1g2	Q3 2008	TMZM87DAM23GG
Turion X2 Ultra ZM-88	2500 MHz	2 x 1 MB	1800 MHz	12.5x	0.75-1.2	35 W	Socket S1g2	Q3 2008	TMZM88DAM23GG
Turion X2 RM-70	2000 MHz	2 x 512 KB	1800 MHz	10x	0.75-1.2	31 W	Socket S1g2	June 4, 2008	TMRM70DAM22GG
Turion X2 RM-72	2100 MHz	2 x 512 KB	1800 MHz	10.5x	0.75-1.2	35 W	Socket S1g2	Q3 2008	TMRM72DAM22GG
Turion X2 RM-74	2200 MHz	2 x 512 KB	1800 MHz	11x	0.75-1.2	35 W	Socket S1g2	Q4 2008	TMRM74DAM22GG
Turion X2 RM-75	2200 MHz	2 x 512 KB	2000 MHz	11x	0.75-1.2	35 W	Socket S1g2	Q4 2008	TMRM75DAM22GG
Turion X2 RM-76	2300 MHz	2 x 512 KB	1800 MHz	11.5x	0.75-1.2	35 W	Socket S1g2	Q4 2008	TMRM76DAM22GG
Turion X2 RM-77	2300 MHz	2 x 512 KB	2000 MHz	11.5x	0.75-1.2	35 W	Socket S1g2	Q4 2008	TMRM77DAM22GG
Athlon X2 QL-60	1900 MHz	2 x 512 KB	1800 MHz	9.5x	0.95-1.1	35 W	Socket S1g2	June 4, 2008	AMQL60DAM22GG
Athlon X2 QL-62	2000 MHz	2 x 512 KB	1800 MHz	10x	0.95-1.1	35 W	Socket S1g2	Q3 2008	AMQL62DAM22GG
Athlon X2 QL-64	2100 MHz	2 x 512 KB	1800 MHz	10.5x	0.95-1.1	35 W	Socket S1g2	Q4 2008	AMQL64DAM22GG
Athlon X2 QL-65	2100 MHz	2 x 512 KB	2000 MHz	10.5x	0.95-1.1	35 W	Socket S1g2	Q4 2008	AMQL65DAM22GG
Athlon X2 QL-66	2200 MHz	2 x 512 KB	1800 MHz	11x	0.95-1.1	35 W	Socket S1g2	Q4 2008	AMQL66DAM22GG
Athlon X2 QL-67	2200 MHz	2 x 512 KB	2000 MHz	11x	0.95-1.1	35 W	Socket S1g2	Q4 2008	AMQL67DAM22GG

==== "Conesus" (65 nm) ====
- All models support: MMX, SSE, SSE2, SSE3, Enhanced 3DNow!, NX bit, AMD64, AMD-V
- Turion Neo X2 L625 supports AMD PowerNow! technology

Model number	Frequency	L2 cache	HT	Multi	Voltage	TDP	Socket	Release date	Order part number
Athlon Neo X2 L325	1500 MHz	2 x 512 KB	800 MHz	7.5x	0.925	18 W	Socket ASB1	June 2009	AMZL325OAX5DY
Athlon Neo X2 L335	1600 MHz	2 x 256 KB	800 MHz	8x	0.925	18 W	Socket ASB1	June 2009	AMZL335OAX5DY
Turion mobile X2 L510	1600 MHz	2 x 512 KB	800 MHz	8x	0.925	18 W	Socket ASB1	June 2009	AMZL510OAX5DY
Turion Neo X2 L625	1600 MHz	2 x 512 KB	800 MHz	8x	0.925	18 W	Socket ASB1	June 2009	TMZL625OAX5DY

=== Turion II / Turion II Ultra / Turion II Neo ===
==== "Caspian" (45 nm) ====
- All models support: MMX, SSE, SSE2, SSE3, SSE4a, Enhanced 3DNow!, NX bit, AMD64, PowerNow!, AMD-V
- All models are to be used with DDR2 memory (Socket S1g3 default design)

Model number	Frequency	L2 cache	FPU width	HT	Multi	TDP	Socket	Release date	Order part number
Athlon II M300	2000 MHz	2x 512 KB	64-bit	1600 MHz	10x	35 W	Socket S1g3	September 10, 2009	AMM300DBO22GQ
Athlon II M320	2100 MHz	2x 512 KB	64-bit	1600 MHz	10.5x	35 W	Socket S1g3	September 10, 2009	AMM320DBO22GQ
Athlon II M340	2200 MHz	2x 512 KB	64-bit	1600 MHz	11x	35 W	Socket S1g3	September 10, 2009	AMM340DBO22GQ
Athlon II M360	2300 MHz	2x 512 KB	64-bit	1600 MHz	11x	35 W	Socket S1g3	May 2010	AMM360DBO22GQ
Turion II M500	2200 MHz	2x 512 KB	128-bit	1800 MHz	11x	35 W	Socket S1g3	September 10, 2009	TMM500DBO22GQ
Turion II M520	2300 MHz	2x 512 KB	128-bit	1800 MHz	11.5x	35 W	Socket S1g3	September 10, 2009	TMM520DBO22GQ
Turion II M540	2400 MHz	2x 512 KB	128-bit	1800 MHz	12x	35 W	Socket S1g3	September 10, 2009	TMM540DBO22GQ
Turion II M560	2500 MHz	2x 512 KB	128-bit	1800 MHz	12x	35 W	Socket S1g3	April 2010	TMM560DBO22GQ
Turion II Ultra M600	2400 MHz	2x 1 MB	128-bit	1800 MHz	12x	35 W	Socket S1g3	September 10, 2009	TMM600DBO23GQ
Turion II Ultra M620	2500 MHz	2x 1 MB	128-bit	1800 MHz	12.5x	35 W	Socket S1g3	September 10, 2009	TMM620DBO23GQ
Turion II Ultra M640	2600 MHz	2x 1 MB	128-bit	1800 MHz	13x	35 W	Socket S1g3	September 10, 2009	TMM640DBO23GQ
Turion II Ultra M660	2700 MHz	2x 1 MB	128-bit	1800 MHz	13.5x	35 W	Socket S1g3	September 10, 2009	TMM660DBO23GQ

==== "Champlain" (45 nm) ====
- All models support: MMX, SSE, SSE2, SSE3, SSE4a, Enhanced 3DNow!, NX bit, AMD64, PowerNow!, AMD-V
- All models are to be used with DDR3 memory (Socket S1g4 default design)

Model number	Clock speed	L2 cache	FPU width	Hyper Transport	Multi	TDP	Socket	Release date	Part number
Turion II P520	2.3 GHz	2 × 1 MB	128-bit	1.8 GHz	11.5×	25 W	Socket S1G4	May 12, 2010	TMP520SGR23GM
Turion II P540	2.4 GHz	2 × 1 MB	128-bit	1.8 GHz	12×	25 W	Socket S1G4	October 4, 2010	TMP540SGR23GM
Turion II P560	2.5 GHz	2 × 1 MB	128-bit	1.8 GHz	12.5×	25 W	Socket S1G4	October 19, 2010	TMP560SGR23GM
Turion II N530	2.5 GHz	2 × 1 MB	128-bit	1.8 GHz	12.5×	35 W	Socket S1G4	May 12, 2010	TMN530DCR23GM
Turion II N550	2.6 GHz	2 × 1 MB	128-bit	1.8 GHz	13×	35 W	Socket S1G4	October 4, 2010	TMN550DCR23GM
Turion II N570	2.7 GHz	2 × 1 MB	128-bit	1.8 GHz	13.5×	35 W	Socket S1G4	January 4, 2011	TMN570DCR23GM

==== "Geneva" (45 nm) ====
Model number	Clock speed	L2 cache	FPU width	Hyper Transport	Multi	TDP	Socket	Release date	Part number
Turion II Neo N40L	1.5 GHz	2 × 1 MB	128-bit	1.6 GHz	7.5×	15 W	Socket ASB2	April 26, 2010	TEN40LGAV23GME
Turion II K625	1.5 GHz	2 × 1 MB	128-bit	1.6 GHz	7.5×	15 W	Socket ASB2	May 12, 2010	TMK625GAV23GM
Turion II K645	1.6 GHz	2 × 1 MB	128-bit	1.6 GHz	8×	15 W	Socket ASB2	January 4, 2011	TMK645GAV23GM
Turion II K665	1.7 GHz	2 × 1 MB	128-bit	1.6 GHz	8.5×	15 W	Socket ASB2	May 12, 2010	TMK665GAV23GM
Turion II K685	1.8 GHz	2 × 1 MB	128-bit	1.6 GHz	9×	15 W	Socket ASB2	January 4, 2011	TMK685GAV23GM
Turion II Neo N54L	2.2 GHz	2 × 1 MB	128-bit	1.6 GHz	11×	25 W	Socket ASB2	May 2010	TEN54LSDV23GME

== See also ==
- AMD mobile platform
- List of AMD mobile microprocessors
- Table of AMD processors
