= ASMedia =

Taiwanese integrated circuit design company

ASMedia Technology Inc.
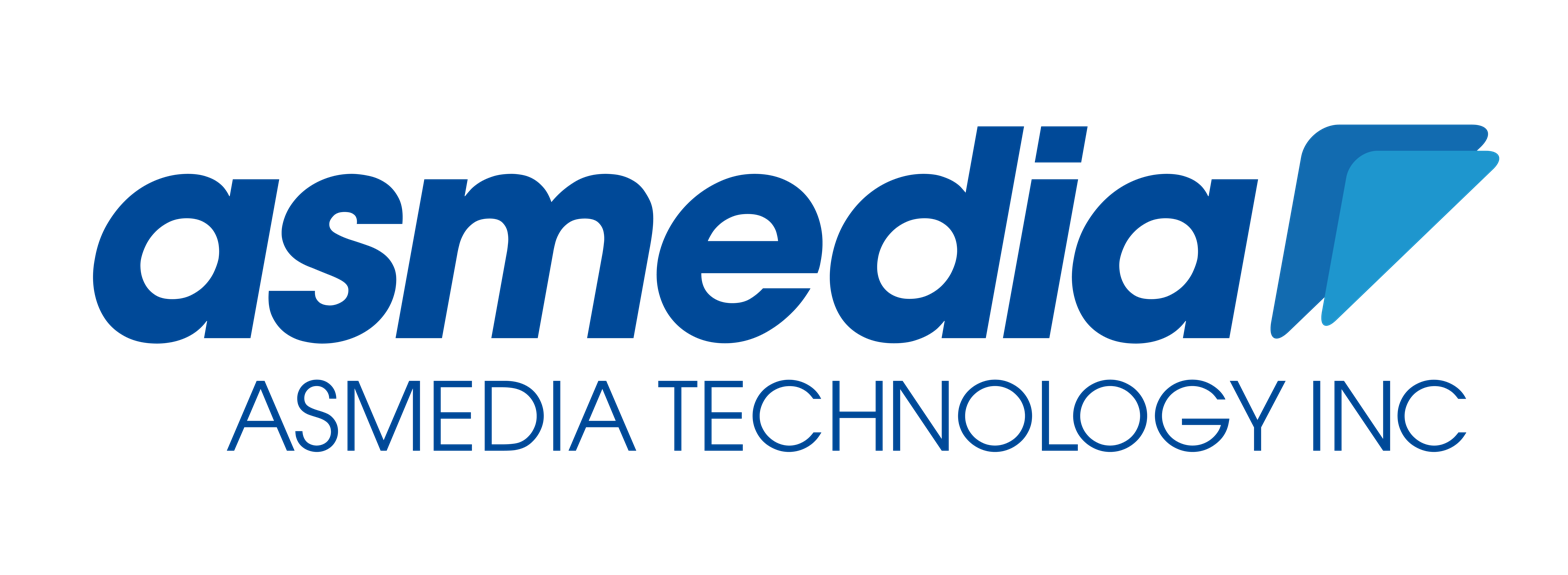
- Company type: Public
- Traded as: TWSE: 5269
- Industry: Semiconductors
- Founded: 2004; 22 years ago
- Headquarters: New Taipei, Taiwan
- Products: Integrated Circuit design
- Parent: ASUS
- Website: www.asmedia.com.tw

ASMedia Technology Inc. (Chinese: 祥碩科技) is a Taiwanese integrated circuit design company. It produces designs for USB, PCI Express and SATA controllers. Excluding the X570 chipset, all of the AM4 chipsets for AMD's Zen micro-architecture were designed by ASMedia.

== History ==
In 2009, ASMedia became the first company in Taiwan to obtain USB-IF Association certification for its USB 3.0 device controller chip, followed by certification for its host controller chip in 2011.

In 2014, VIA won a courtcase against ASMedia, after it sued ASMedia for using confidential VIA intellectual property related to USB technology, obtained from ex-VIA employees who had joined ASMedia.

In 2015, ASMedia became the first company in the world to obtain USB-IF Association certification for its USB 3.1 host controller chip and USB 3.1 to SATA bridge controller chip.

In 2016, the company launched the world's first second-generation integrated Type-C USB 3.1 (10G) to SATA bridge controller chip and obtained USB-IF Association certification.

In 2019, it unveiled the world's first USB 3.2 Gen2x2 controller chip and was selected as one of Forbes Asia's 200 Best Under A Billion companies.

In 2023, ASMedia became the first company in the world to obtain USB-IF Association certification for its USB4 device controller chip, USB4 with Thunderbolt 3 device controller chip and USB 3.2 Gen2x2 hub controller chip.

In 2024, the ASMedia ASM4242 USB4 Host Controller Chip Achieves Thunderbolt 4 Certification.

== Products ==
The company's main business is the design and development, sales, and technical services of high-speed Switch IC, PCIe bridge IC, and USB3.2/ USB4 control IC. The main commodity items are listed as follows:

- USB controller IC
- PCIe bridge controller
- SATA controller IC
- High-speed Switch controller IC
- Specific integrated chip

New Products Planned for Development

- New-generation USB4 host, device IC and USB hub IC
- Fourth and fifth generation PCI Express bridge controller chips
- Sixth generation PCI Express technology
- PD controller
- Low-power physical layer development for IO Hub
- Introduction of new process technology
- Introduction of new packaging technology

Product Category	Product Series	Model
USB Controller IC	USB4 Gen2x2 Host	ASM4242
	USB3.2 Gen2x2 Host	ASM3242, ASM3241
	USB3.2 Gen2x1 Host	ASM3142
	USB3.2 Gen1 Host	ASM3042
	USB4 Gen2x2 to PCIe NVMe	ASM2464PD
	USB4 Gen2x2 to PCIe	ASM2464PDX
	USB3.2 Gen2x2 to PCIe NVMe	ASM2364
	USB3.2 Gen2x1 to PCIe NVMe	ASM2362
	USB3.2 Gen2x1 to SATA	ASM235CM, ASM1352R
	USB3.2 Gen1 to SATA	ASM225CM, ASM1156, ASM1153E, ASM1153
	USB3.2 Gen1 Hub	ASM1074
	USB3.2 Gen2x1 Hub	ASM2074, ASM2074C
	USB3.2 Gen2x2 Hub	ASM3074
PCIe Bridge Controller	PCIe Gen3 Packet Switch	ASM2812I, ASM2806I, ASM2806A, ASM2824, ASM2812, ASM2806
	PCIe Gen2 Packet Switch	ASM1812I, ASM1806I, ASM1824, ASM1812, ASM1806, ASM1184e, ASM1182e
	PCIe to PCI Bridge Controller	ASM1083, ASM1085
SATA Controller IC	Port Multiplier	ASM1092
	SATA RAID Controller	ASM1092R
	PCIe to SATA Controller	ASM1166, ASM1164, ASM1064, ASM1062, ASM1061
	PCIe to SATA RAID Controller	ASM1061R, ASM1062R
High Speed Switch Controller IC	HDMI Level Shifter	ASM1442K
	USB Switch	ASM1458
	SATA Switch	ASM1456B, ASM1456
	USB/SATA/PCIe Re-driver	ASM1468, ASM1465, ASM1467, ASM1466, ASM1464
	Type C Mux	ASM1543
	PCIe Switch	ASM2480B, ASM1480
	USB3.1 Gen 2 Re-Timer	ASM1562
ASIC	Customized Chip Solution	ASIC

== Corporate Affairs ==
Yearly Operating Revenue and Net Income after Tax in hundred million NT$

Year	2023	2022	2021	2020	2019	2018	2017	2016	2015	2014
Revenue	64	52.5	60.1	69.9	37.5	37.2	29.8	20.6	15.6	15.2
Net Income	22.3	26.2	31.9	29.3	9.65	9.56	4.32	3.5	2.07	2.28

2017 The Company was selected as one of the Top 200 Small and Medium Enterprises in Asia by Forbes.

2018 The Company was selected as one of the Top 200 Small and Medium Enterprises in Asia by Forbes.

2020 Nominated by the Global Semiconductor Alliance (GSA) for Best Financially Managed Semiconductor Company

2020 Chairman Shen Cheng-Lai was selected for the Harvard Business Review Top 100 CEOs in Taiwan.

2022 Chairman Shen Cheng-Lai was selected for the Harvard Business Review Top 100 CEOs in Taiwan.
