= Mobile processor =

Processor found in mobile devices

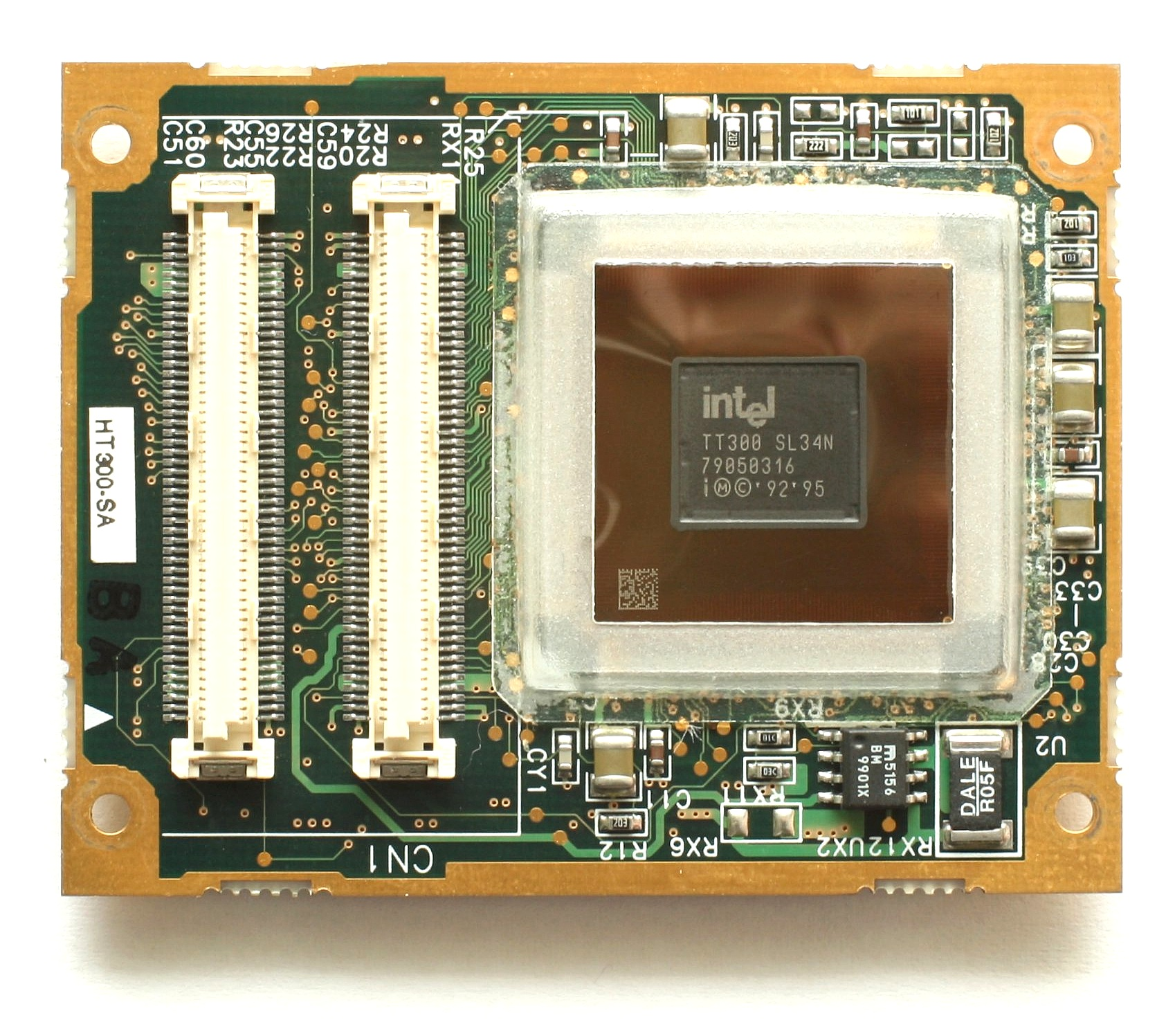
An Intel Pentium Mobile, clocked at 300 MHz (1998)

A mobile processor is a microprocessor designed for mobile devices such as laptops and cell phones.

A CPU chip is designed for portable computers to run fanless, under 10 to 15W, which is cool enough without a fan. It is typically housed in a smaller chip package, but more importantly, in order to run cooler, it uses lower voltages than its desktop counterpart and has more sleep mode capability. A mobile processor can be throttled down to different power levels or sections of the chip can be turned off entirely when not in use. Further, the clock frequency may be stepped down under low processor loads. This stepping down conserves power and prolongs battery life.

== In laptops ==
One of the main characteristics differentiating laptop processors from other CPUs is low power consumption, which is not without tradeoffs: they also tend to not perform as well as their desktop counterparts.

The notebook processor has become an important market segment in the semiconductor industry. Notebook computers are a popular format of the broader category of mobile computers. The objective of a notebook computer is to provide the performance and functionality of a desktop computer in a portable size and weight.

Cell phones and PDAs use "system on a chip" integrated circuits that use less power than most notebook processors.

While it is possible to use desktop processors in laptops, this practice is generally not recommended, as desktop processors heat faster than notebook processors and drain batteries faster.

== Examples ==
=== Current ===
- ARM architecture (used in Chromebooks, Windows 10, Windows 11 laptops, Linux netbooks and recent Macs)
  - Apple M series
  - Huawei: HiSilicon Kirin
  - MediaTek
  - Nvidia: Tegra
  - Qualcomm: Snapdragon
  - Rockchip
  - Samsung Electronics: Exynos
- x86
  - AMD: Ryzen, Athlon, and A-Series APU
  - Intel: Xeon mobile, Core, Pentium, and Celeron

=== Former ===
- PowerPC
  - Motorola and Freescale Semiconductor made PowerPC G4 processors for the pre-Intel Apple Computer notebooks.
- x86
  - Transmeta: Crusoe and Efficeon
  - Intel: Pentium M
  - AMD: Mobile Athlon II, Mobile Athlon 64, Mobile Sempron
