= S3 Savage =

Line of PC graphics chipsets by S3

Savage 4 logo

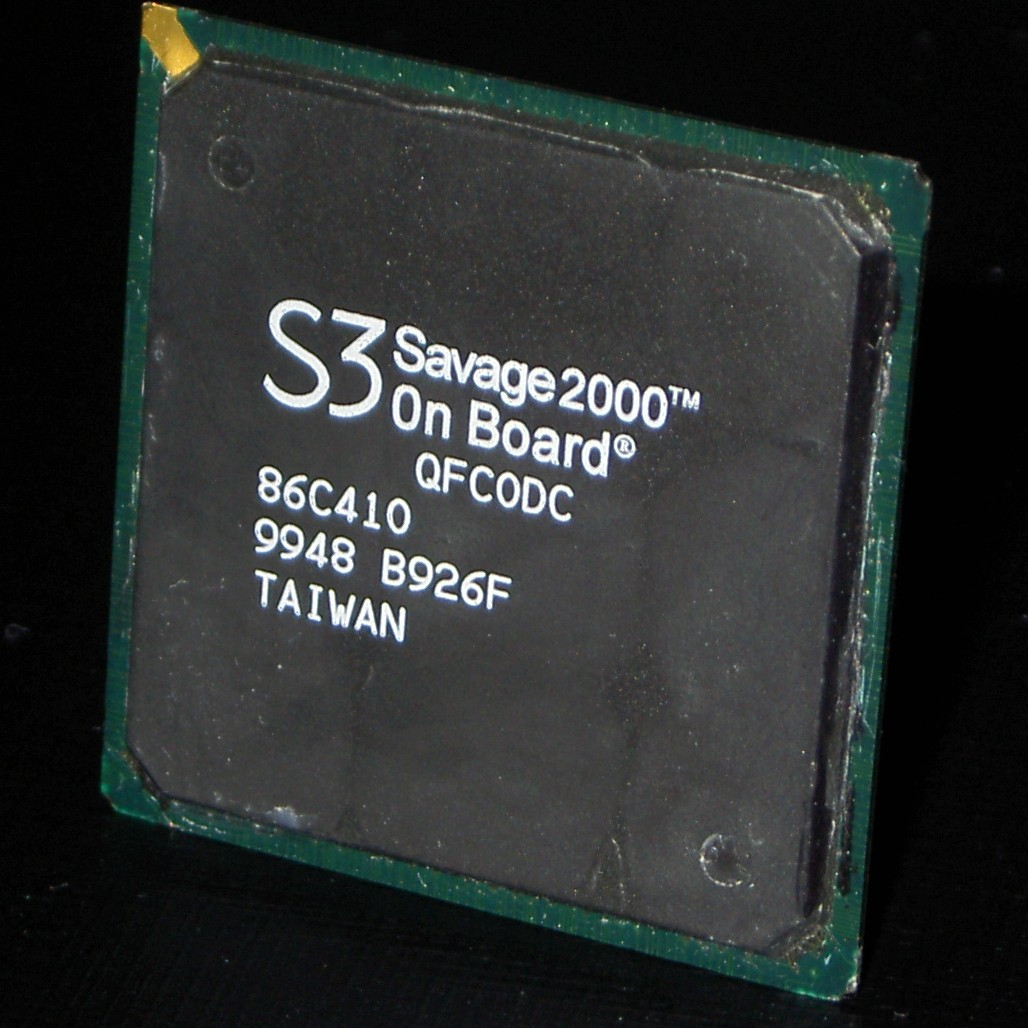
Savage 2000

Savage was a product-line of PC graphics chipsets designed by S3.

== Graphics Processors ==
=== Savage 3D ===
At a 1998 E3 Expo S3 introduced the first Savage product, Savage3D. Compared to its ViRGE-derived predecessor (Trio3D), Savage3D was a technological leap forward. Its innovative feature-set included the following:

- "free" (single-cycle) trilinear-filtering
- hardware motion-compensation and subpicture alpha-blending (MPEG-2 video)
- integrated NTSC/PAL TV-encoder, (optional) Macrovision
- S3 Texture Compression (S3TC)
- multi-tap X/Y interpolating front-end (BITBLT) and back-end (overlay) video-scaler

Unfortunately for S3, deliveries of the Savage3D were hampered by poor manufacturing yields. Only one major board-vendor, Hercules, made any real effort to ship a Savage3D product. S3's yield problems forced Hercules to hand pick usable chips from the silicon wafers. Combined with poor drivers and the chip's lack of multitexturing support, the Savage3D failed in the market.

Savage 3D also dropped support for the S3D API from the S3 ViRGE predecessor.

In early 1999, S3 retired the Savage3D and released the Savage4 family. Many of the Savage3D's limitations were addressed by the Savage 4 chipset.

=== Savage4 ===
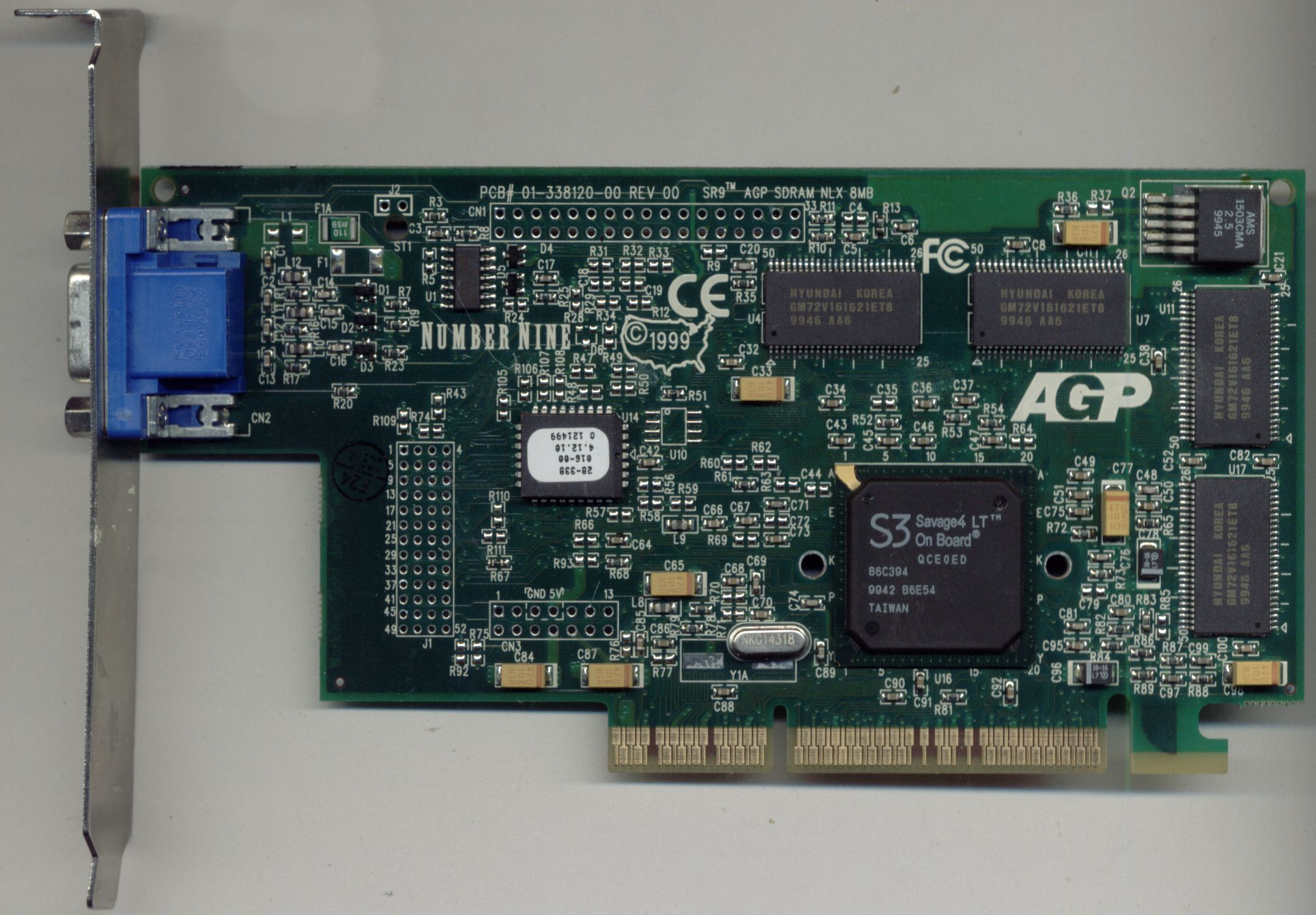
Number Nine's S3 Savage4 LT 8MB card

Savage4 was an evolution of Savage 3D technology in many ways. S3 refined the chip, fixing hardware bugs and streamlining the chip for both cost reduction and performance. They added single-pass multi-texturing, meaning the board could sample 2 textures per pixel in one pass (not one clock cycle) through the rendering engine instead of halving its texture fillrate in dual-textured games like Savage 3D. Savage4 supported the then-new AGP 4X although at the older 3.3 voltage specification. It was manufactured on a 250 nm process, like Savage 3D. The graphics core was clocked at 125 MHz, with the board's SDRAM clocked at either 125 MHz or 143 MHz (Savage4 Pro). They could be equipped with 8-32 MiB memory. And while an integrated TV encoder was dropped, the DVD acceleration was commendable, and the chip supported an early version of the DVI interface for LCDs.

A "LT" suffixed part featured reduced power consumption and was, like ATI's Rage LT series, intended for laptops. Nevertheless, this ended up in several AGP cards such as Number Nine's S3 Savage4 8MB part (pictured).

The Savage4 gained numerous design-wins with board-vendors, including Diamond Multimedia (Stealth III S540) and Creative Labs. The Savage4 series' single cycle trilinear filtering and S3TC texture compression created a 3D card with exceptional image quality. However, by continuing with a bandwidth-constraining 64-bit memory bus, S3 guaranteed this graphics card would never be a performance part under 32-bit color. Drivers were again an issue with S3's product; holding back overall performance and causing compatibility issues with software and hardware.

Savage4 was hardly a match for the new 3dfx Voodoo3, ATI Rage 128, Matrox G400, or NVIDIA Riva TNT2. In OpenGL games such as Quake II, Savage4 performed about as well as G400 did with its slow initial OpenGL support and was far behind TNT2 and Voodoo3. Within Direct3D titles such as Shogo: Mobile Armor Division, Savage 4 scored almost 50% slower than TNT2 and Voodoo3 even at a low resolution such as 800x600. The chip was very popular for budget machines, with many generic retail products based on it and OEM PC wins.

Only the high-quality texture capability from its S3TC support gave it good mind share with the gaming community. Unreal Tournament and Quake III Arena, two popular games at the time, shipped with built-in support for S3TC. The compressed textures were a vast improvement over the standard textures used on all other cards. Not only that, but S3TC allowed these much higher quality textures to be rendered with negligible performance impact.

=== Savage MX/IX ===
S3 designed these chips for notebooks, but they were also sold as budget AGP and PCI graphics cards. The MX had many similarities to Savage4 but had reduced clocks and added an integrated TV out function with optional Macrovision. The Savage IX was very similar to the MX, but had 8MB SDRAM directly integrated into the chip to make it even more compact.

=== Savage 2000 ===
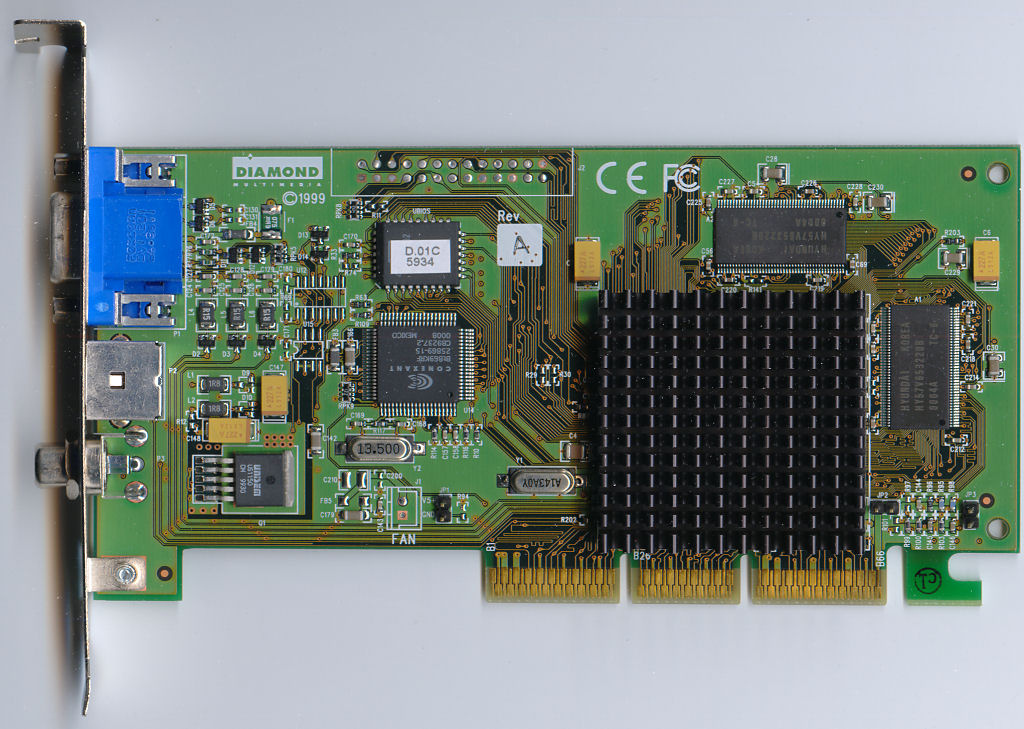
Diamond's Viper II Z200

During 1999, Diamond and S3 merged and the Savage 2000 GPU was the first product from the combined companies. The final graphics card was released late that year as the Diamond Viper II Z200.

The GPU consisted of roughly 12 million transistors, approximately half the number of transistors of the NVIDIA GeForce 256. Despite this low level of complexity, it was marketed as being similar to NVIDIA's GeForce 256 series. Savage 2000 supported S3's S3TC texture compression, a hardware transform and lighting engine named "S3TL", and was equipped with a "QuadTexture Engine" capable of a single quad-textured pixel per clock or 2 dual-textured pixels per clock. The 3D engine had texture fill-rate potentially equivalent to GeForce 256 at the same clock speed. At the end of 1999, the Savage 2000 and the GeForce 256 were the only computer game oriented cards with hardware T&L. S3 engineers claimed that the S3TL engine had feature parity with GeForce 256, and that it could render 2.5 million lit and clipped triangles/second. However, S3TL shipped completely non-functional, primarily because initial drivers were Direct3D 6-based (Direct3D 7 was the first release with HW T&L support). Savage 2000 was an AGP 2X/4X card and had an internal 350 MHz RAMDAC. The Diamond Viper II Z200 had 32 MB SDR SDRAM.

The initial pre-release specifications had called for a 175 MHz core clock rate, with a resulting 700 million texels/second fillrate. The final card shipped 50 MHz slower, at 125 MHz, resulting in a fill-rate of 500 MTexels/second (only slightly ahead of GeForce 256). With respect to RAM, the card shipped with 166 MHz SDRAM clocked at 155 MHz. The result in benchmarks showed the card performing ahead of the prior generation of cards (Matrox G400, ATI Rage Fury MAXX, NVIDIA RIVA TNT2, 3dfx Voodoo3) but it did not always keep up with the GeForce 256. The drivers were discovered to be buggy as well, with issues with numerous game titles.

Diamond eventually released drivers with S3TL support in OpenGL and Direct3D. Unfortunately S3TL does not function properly. It causes missing textures, errors in geometry and models, and minimal performance benefits. Whether the issues are a result of poor drivers or defective hardware is unknown.

Seemingly unwilling to invest the time and effort required to set up a structured internal driver development team, S3's graphics division was sold to VIA for $321 million in 2001. S3 would regroup in later years and create the Chrome series.

=== Savage XP/AlphaChrome ===
The Savage XP was the first chip announced by the regrouped S3 in 2002. The mobile version was going to be called AlphaChrome but was otherwise completely identical. The Savage XP was basically a repaired version of the Savage 2000 and considered too outdated. It was never sold; only prototypes exist.

=== Motherboard integrated chipsets ===
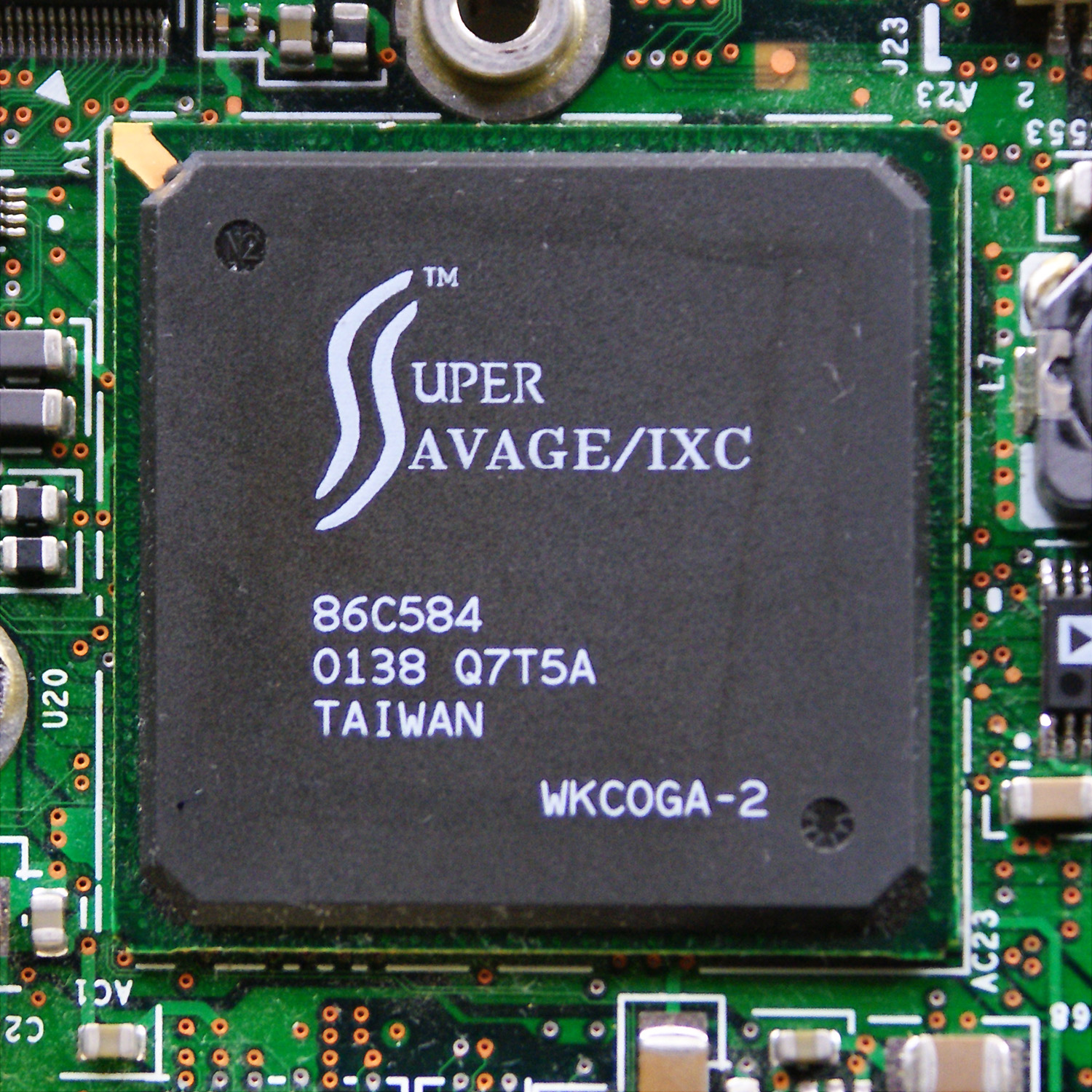
SuperSavage IXC

As a result of being sold to VIA in 2001, development of discrete Savage graphics cards was eventually discontinued. The dominant GPU market share once held by S3, now fell primarily to NVIDIA with its GeForce line, and ATI's Radeon series. Savage hardware designs migrated into integrated motherboard graphics. In this respect at least, S3's economical use of transistors proved highly advantageous. For example, the Savage 4 design became part of an identical integrated GPU in the Twister chipset.

Eventually, hybrid Savage4/Savage2000 'ProSavage' IGP designs became part of VIA chipsets such as the KM133, PL133T, PM133T, KM266, P4M266, and KM333. The ProSavage designs were derived from a combination of the 3D component of Savage4 and 2D from Savage 2000. Variants called SuperSavage MX & IX were used in notebooks as well. A ProSavage-DDR design also exists; the only improvement is DDR memory support, which is a configurable 8 - 32MB portion taken from the system's main memory.

The Savage / ProSavage IGP range was superseded by the Castle Rock (CLE266) IGP, which later was christened VIA UniChrome. UniChrome continued to be marginally improved evolving into the UniChrome Pro and UniChrome Pro II designs.

Chip	Pipeline Pixel/TMU	Memory clock	Memory interface	Notes
ProSavage(4/8/DDR)	1 × 2	System RAM	64-bit	aka Twister. Memory clock corresponds to chosen system DDR speed.
SuperSavage MX & IX	1 × 2	Varies	64/128-bit	Notebook chips

== Models ==
Chronological order

Chip	Release	Die process	Core clock	Pipeline Pixel/TMU	Fillrate max (MT/s)	Memory clock	Memory interface	Notes
Savage 3D (86C390/86C391)	6/1998	0.25	100–120 MHz	1 × 1	100–120	120 MHz	64-bit	AGP 2X or PCI. Versions: 390 (with Macrovision), 391 (without Macrovision).
Savage 4 LT (86C394)	2/1999	0.25	110 MHz	1 × 1	110	110 MHz	64-bit	AGP 2X.
Savage 4 GT (86C395)	2/1999	0.25	110 MHz	1 × 1	110	125 MHz	64-bit	AGP 4X.
Savage 4 Pro-M (86C396)		0.25	110–125 MHz	1 × 1		125–143 MHz	64-bit	AGP 4X.
Savage 4 Pro (86C397)	2/1999	0.25	110–125 MHz	1 × 1		125–143 MHz	64-bit	AGP 4X or PCI. Sav4 added single-pass multitexturing.
Savage/MX (86C290)	6/1999	0.18	100 MHz	1 × 1	100	100 MHz	64-bit	Notebooks. AGP 4X.
Savage/IX (86C298)	6/1999	0.18	100 MHz	1 × 1	100	100 MHz	128-bit	Notebooks. AGP 4X. 8MB memory integrated into the same chip as the GPU.
Savage 4 Xtreme (86C398)	8/1999	0.25	166 MHz	1 × 1	166	166 MHz	64-bit	AGP 4X.
Savage 2000 (86C410)	11/1999	0.18/0.22	125 MHz	2 x 2	500	155 MHz	128-bit	aka GX4. Hybrid process. AGP 4X. Non-functional T&L.
