= S3 Trio =

Computer graphics hardware

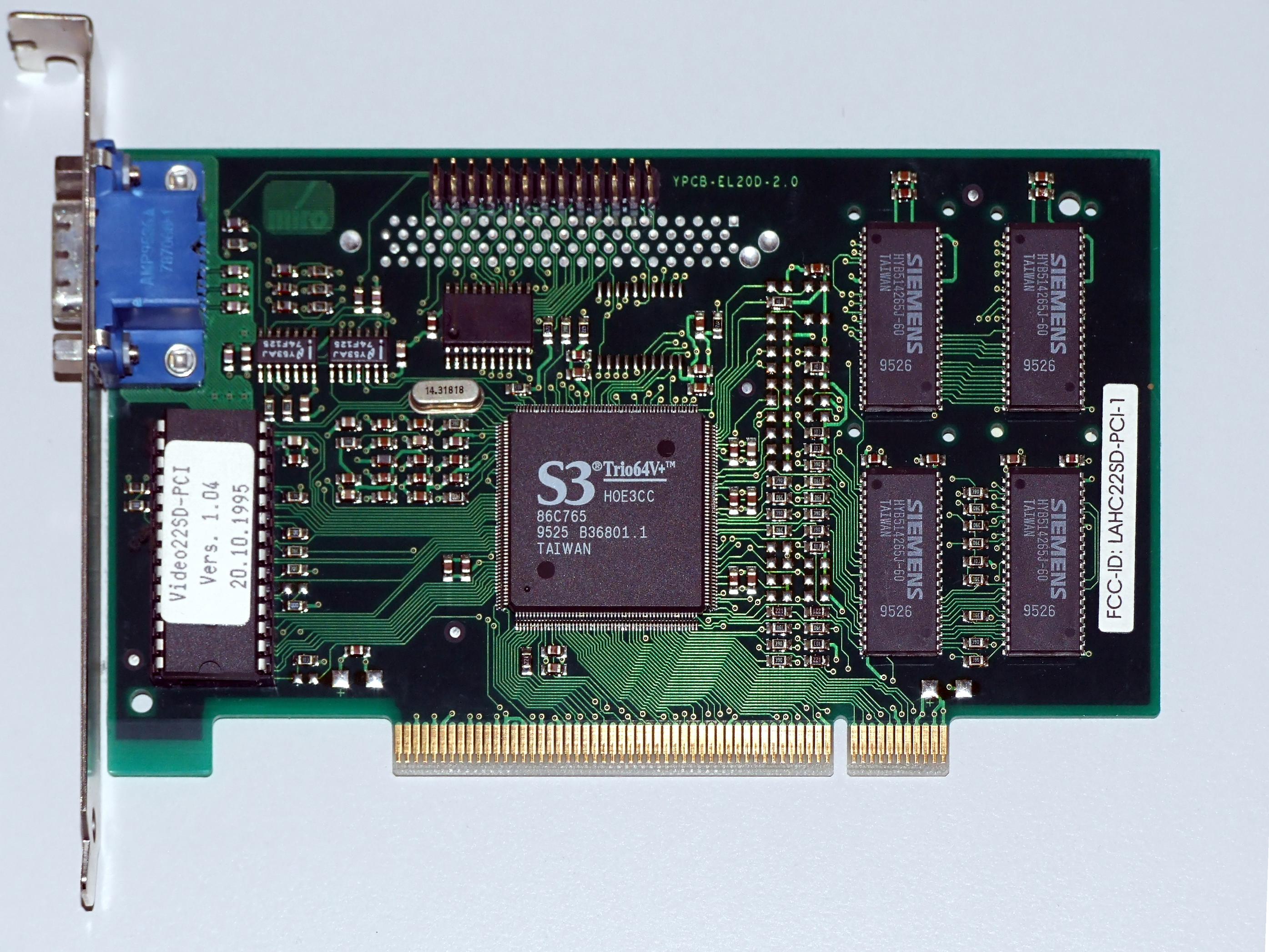
S3 Trio64V+

The S3 Trio range were popular video cards for personal computers and were S3's first fully integrated graphics accelerators. As the name implies, three previously separate components were now included in the same ASIC: the graphics core, RAMDAC and clock generator. The increased integration allowed a graphics card to be simpler than before and thus cheaper to produce.

== Variants ==
The Trio64 and 64V+, first appeared in 1995, are essentially fully integrated solutions based upon the earlier Vision 864 and 868 accelerator chipsets. Like the 868, the 64V+ has a video acceleration engine that can perform YUV to RGB color space conversion and horizontal linear filtered scaling. Unlike the Vision964/968, the Trio chips do not support VRAM, and are limited to FPM DRAM and EDO DRAM only. The 2D graphics hardware was later used in the ViRGE.

The Trio32 is a low-cost version of the Trio64 with a narrower 32-bit DRAM interface (vs. 64-bit).

The Trio64V2 improved on the 64V+ by including vertical bilinear filtering. The 2D graphics core was later used in the ViRGE/DX and ViRGE/GX. Like the corresponding ViRGE chips, the 64V2 also came in /DX and /GX variants, with the latter supporting more modern SDRAM or SGRAM. The final version, called the Trio3D, was effectively the 128-bit successor to the ViRGE/GX2.

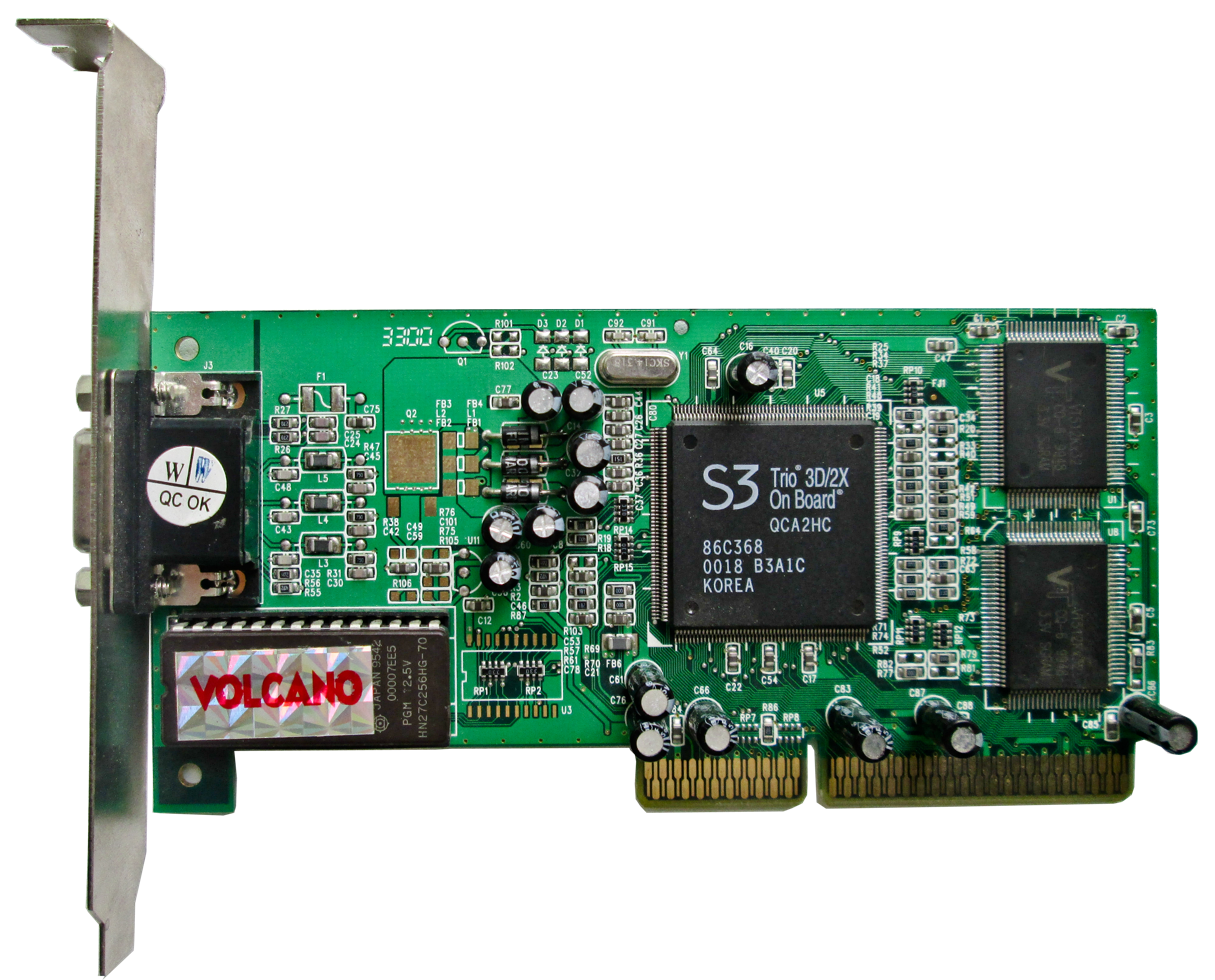
S3 Trio 3D/2X

The various Trio chips were used on many motherboards. Because of the popularity of the series and the resulting compatibility advantages, they are used in various PC emulation and virtualization packages such as DOSBox, Microsoft Virtual PC, PCem and 86Box.

== Specifications ==
- Motherboard interface: VLB, PCI, AGP (Trio3D only)
- Video Connector: 15-pin VGA connector
- VRAM: 1 to 2 megabyte of FPM/EDO DRAM (for the 2D cards)
