= VP3 (disambiguation) =

VP3 is a video compression format owned by Google and created by On2 Technologies.

VP3 may also refer to:

- Apollo VP3, a computer chipset
- Virtual Pool 3, a video game
- VP3, a viral protein; for example in Rotavirus
- VP-3, a patrol squadron of the U.S. Navy
