= S20 =

S20 may refer to:

== Aviation ==
- Letov Š-20, a Czechoslovak fighter
- Rans S-20 Raven, an American light-sport aircraft
- SABCA S-20, a Belgian aircraft
- Short S.20 Mercury, a British parasite seaplane
- Sikorsky S-20, a Russian biplane fighter
- SPAD S.XX, later the Blériot-SPAD S.20, a French fighter

== Electronics ==
- Canon PowerShot S20, a digital camera
- Chrome S20 series, a graphics accelerator
- Samsung Galaxy S20, a series of smartphones
- S20, a discontinued music synthesizer from Akai

== Rail and transit ==
=== Lines ===
- S20 (Long Island bus), in Suffolk County, New York, United States
- S20 (Munich), in Germany
- S20 (RER Fribourg), in Switzerland
- S20 (St. Gallen S-Bahn), a St. Gallen S-Bahn rush-hour service, Switzerland
- S20 (TILO), in Ticino, Switzerland
- S20 (ZVV), rush-hour service of the Zurich S-Bahn, Switzerland

=== Stations ===
- Kamisawa Station (Nagoya), in Midori-ku, Nagoya, Aichi, Japan
- Imazato Station (Osaka Metro), in Japan
- Shikaribetsu Station, in Niki, Yoichi District, Hokkaidō, Japan
- Shinozaki Station, in Edogawa, Tokyo, Japan

== Roads ==
- S20 Shanghai Outer Ring Expressway, China
- County Route S20 (California), United States

== Submarines ==
- Brazilian submarine Humaitá (S20)
- HMS Opportune (S20), a submarine of the Royal Navy
- INS Kursura (S20), a submarine of the Indian Navy
- Type S20 submarine, an export version of China's Type 039A submarine
- USS S-20 (SS-125), a submarine of the United States Navy

== Homoglyphic errors for S2O ==
- S_{2}O, disulfur monoxide
- S2O, Subscribe to Open, one of dozens of business models for open access

== Other uses ==
- 40S ribosomal protein S20
- British NVC community S20, a natural habitat of swamps and tall-herb fens in the British National Vegetation Classification system
- Nissan S20 engine, an automobile engine
- S20: When using do not eat or drink, a safety phrase
- Sako S20, a Finnish bolt-action rifle
- Toyota Crown (S20), a luxury sedan
- Venda language
- S20, a postcode district in Sheffield, England
