= Chrome 500 series =

S3 Graphics Chrome 500 series is the successor of S3 Graphics Chrome S20 series, and is produced in parallel to the S3 Graphics Chrome 400.

== Availability ==
The 530 GT is sold from S3's store for a price of $54.95 USD. No other online stores are known to carry this model and it is out of stock as of November 6, 2009. The 540GTX is sold from S3's Gstore for $69.95. It is similarly out of stock although a low profile version has been produced by Aopen Japan and is still on sale as of November 6, 2009.

== Features ==
The production model is with a 65 nm process, supports DirectX 10.1, OpenGL 3.0, and uses the PCI Express 2.0 interface. Chromotion engine now supports Variable length decoding, and dual-stream Blu-ray playback. Display unit includes 2 dual-link DVI transmitters with integrated HDMI (audio passthrough) and HDCP, an integrated dual channel LVDS transmitter, an integrated TV/HDTV encoder, and support for two analog CRTs. 530 GT runs at 625 MHz core speed, and has 512 MB of 500 MHz GDDR2 memory on a 64 bit bus. The 540GTX added a DisplayPort in the full height version as well as increased clock and memory speeds of 800Mhz and 850Mhz GDDR3 respectively.

From Linux driver version 14.02.10 on, S3 Chrome 500 video cards support VDPAU.

== Performance ==
The 500 MHz GDDR2 memory clock, combined with the cards 64 bit memory bus, gives it a total memory bandwidth of 8 GB/s, on par with budget cards from Nvidia and AMD. Performance information released by S3 indicates the cards performance in 3dMark 2006 is comparable to an AMD HD4350.
