= List of VIA chipsets =

This is a list of computer motherboard chipsets made by VIA Technologies. Northbridge chips are listed first, primarily by CPU-socket or CPU-family; southbridge chips are listed in a later table.

== Background ==
VIA chipsets support CPUs from Intel, AMD (e.g. the Athlon 64) and VIA themselves (e.g. the VIA C3 or C7). They support CPUs as old as the i386 in the early 1990s. In the early 2000s, their chipsets began to offer on-chip graphics support from VIA's joint venture with S3 Graphics beginning in 2001; this support continued into the early 2010s, with the release of the VX11H in August 2012.

VIA chipsets declined in popularity as other chipsets began to offer better performance, VIA entered other markets and Intel began to offer more powerful integrated graphics on their CPU dies.

== Chipsets by CPU socket ==
The term V-Link indicates VIA's northbridge/southbridge interconnect bus.

=== Socket 3 ===
Chipset	Part numbers	South bridge	Release date	Processors	FSB	Memory types	Memory bus	Max. memory	Max. cache	Max. cacheable RAM	Parity/ ECC	PCI
VT82C470	VT82C470			386	25/33/40 MHz	FPM	25/33/40 MHz	?	?	?	No	No
VT82C475	VT82C475			386	25/33/40 MHz	FPM	25/33/40 MHz	?	?	?	No	No
VT82C486A	VT82C486A + VT82C482 + VT82C483, VT82C505 (for PCI)	VT82C482, VT82C505	1993	386, Socket 3	25/33/40 MHz	FPM	25/33/40 MHz	?	?	?	No	2.0 (w/ VT82C505)
VT82C495	VT82C495, VT82C491, VT82C480/1	VT82C491, VT82C480/1	1993	Socket 3	25/33/40 MHz	FPM	25/33/40 MHz	?	1 MB	?	No	No
VT82C496G (Pluto)	VT82C496G, VT82C505 (for PCI)	VT82C505	1994	Socket 3	25/33/40 MHz	FPM	25/33/40 MHz	128 MB	1 MB	?	No	2.0 (w/ VT82C505)

=== Socket 5 and Socket 7 ===
All chipsets listed support a maximum cache memory size of 2 MB and are PCI 2.1 compliant

Chipset	OEM names	Northbridge	Southbridge	Release date	Processors	FSB	Memory types	Memory bus	Max. memory	Max. cacheable RAM	Parity/ ECC	AGP	IGP
Apollo Master (VT82C570M)		VT82C575M + VT82C577M (x2)	VT82C576M + VT82C416	1995	Socket 5	50/60/66 MHz	FPM, EDO, BEDO	66 MHz	1024 MB	1024 MB w/ 1 MB L2	No	No	No
Apollo Master Plus (VT82C570MV)		VT82C575MV + VT82C577MV (x2)	VT82C576MV + VT82C416MV	1995	Socket 5	50/60/66 MHz	FPM, EDO, BEDO	66 MHz	1024 MB	1024 MB w/ 1 MB L2	No	No	No
Apollo VP (VT82C580VP)	VX Pro, VX Two	VT82C585VP + VT82C587VP (x2)	VT82C586	Oct. 1995 (Announced) Q1 1996 (Available)	Socket 7	50/60/66 MHz	FPM, EDO, BEDO, SDRAM	66 MHz	512 MB	512 MB w/ 2 MB L2	No	No	No
Apollo VP2 (VT82C590)	AMD-640	VT82C595	VT82C586A or VT82C586B (VP2/97)	May 1996 (Announced) Q3 1996 (Available)	Socket 7	50/60/66/75 MHz	FPM, EDO, BEDO, SDRAM	66 MHz	512 MB	512 MB w/ 2 MB L2	Yes	No	No
Apollo VPX (VT82C580VPX)	ETEQ 6618, TX Pro III, VX Pro+, VX Two	VT82C585VPX + VT82C587VP (x2)	VT82C586A or VT82C586B (VPX/97)	Dec. 1996 (Announced) Q1 1997 (Available)	Socket 7	50/60/66/75 MHz	FPM, EDO, BEDO, SDRAM	66 MHz	512 MB	512 MB w/ 2 MB L2	No	No	No
Apollo VP3	ETEQ 6628	VT82C597	VT82C586B	May 1997 (Announced) Q3 1997 (Available)	Socket 7	66 MHz	FPM, EDO, BEDO, SDRAM	66 MHz	1024 MB	1024 MB w/ 2 MB L2	Yes	2×	No
Apollo MVP3	ETEQ 6638, AGP Pro PC-100	VT82C598AT or VT82C598MVP	VT82C586B or VT82C596	Sept. 1997 (Announced) Q1 1998 (Available)	Super Socket 7	66–100 MHz	FPM, EDO, BEDO, SDRAM	66 - 100 MHz	768 MB	512 MB w/ 2 MB L2	Yes	2×	No
Apollo MVP4	VIA GRA	VT82C501	VT82C686A/B or VT82C596B	Aug. 1998 (Announced) Q4 1998 (Available)	Super Socket 7	66–100 MHz	FPM, EDO, BEDO, SDRAM	66 - 100 MHz	768 MB	512 MB w/ 2 MB L2	Yes	No	Trident Blade3D

- The only difference between the Apollo Master and the Apollo Master Plus is that the Plus does not support pipelined burst cache memory.
- The Apollo VP and Apollo VP2 chipsets were initially referenced by VIA as Apollo VP-1 and Apollo VP-2 respectively, later renamed to Apollo VP and Apollo VP2 when the "/97" upgrades became available.
- The Apollo VPX chipset is a low-cost solution that replaced the Apollo VP but with features similar to the VP2.
- AMD licensed the VIA Apollo VP2/97 core logic architecture for its AMD 640 chipset.

=== Socket 8, Slot 1 and Socket 370 ===
Chipset	OEM names	Northbridge	Southbridge	Release date	Processors	FSB	SMP	Memory types	Memory bus	Max. memory	Parity/ECC	PCI	V-Link	AGP	IGP
Apollo P6 (VT82C680)		VT82C685 + VT82C687	VT82C586A or VT82C586B	Jan. 1996 (Announced) Q4 1996 (Available)	Pentium Pro	66 MHz	Yes	FPM, EDO, BEDO, SDRAM	66 MHz	1.0 GB	Yes	2.1	No	No	No
Apollo Pro	BXpert	VT82C691	VT82C586B or VT82C596	May 11, 1998	Pentium Pro, Pentium II	66/100 MHz	No	FPM, EDO, BEDO, SDRAM, VCSDRAM	66/100 MHz	1.0 GB	Yes	2.1	No	2×	No
Apollo Pro Plus	BX Too	VT82C693	VT82C596A or VT82C686A	December 24, 1998	Pentium II, Celeron	66/100 MHz	No	FPM, EDO, SDRAM, VCSDRAM	66/100 MHz	1.0 GB	Yes	2.1	No	2×	No
Apollo Pro133		VT82C693A	VT82C596B or VT82C686A	July 19, 1999	Pentium II, Pentium III, Celeron	66/100/133 MHz	No	FPM, EDO, SDRAM, VCSDRAM	66/100/133 MHz	1.5 GB	Yes	2.2	No	2×	No
Apollo Pro133A		VT82C694X or VT82C694MP	VT82C596B, VT82C686A, VT8231	October 11, 1999	Pentium III, Pentium II	66/100/133 MHz	Yes (VT82C694MP only)	PC100/PC133 SDRAM, VCSDRAM	66/100/133 MHz	2.0 GB	Yes	2.2	No	4×	No
Apollo Pro133T		VT82C694T	VT82C686B, VT8231	May 30, 2001	Pentium III, Celeron, Pentium III Tualatin	66/100/133 MHz	No	PC100/PC133 SDRAM, VCSDRAM	66/100/133 MHz	2.0 GB	Yes	2.2	No	4×	No
Apollo Pro266		VT8633	VT8233	September 20, 2000	Pentium III, Celeron, C3	66/100/133 MHz	Yes	SDRAM, VCSDRAM, DDR SDRAM	200/266 MHz DDR SDRAM, 100/133 MHz SDRAM	4.0 GB	Yes	2.2	Yes, 266 MB/s	4×	No
Apollo Pro266T		VT8653	VT8233C	May 30, 2001	Pentium III, Celeron, Pentium III Tualatin, C3	66/100/133 MHz	Yes	SDRAM, VCSDRAM, DDR SDRAM	200/266 MHz DDR SDRAM, 100/133 MHz SDRAM	4.0 GB	Yes	2.2	Yes, 266 MB/s	4×	No
Apollo PM601 (ProMedia)		VT8601	VT82C686A		Pentium III, Celeron, C3	66/100/133 MHz	No	FPM, EDO, SDRAM, VCSDRAM	66/100/133 MHz	1.5 GB	No	2.2	No	No	Yes (Trident Blade3D)
Apollo PLE133		VT8601A	VT82C686B, VT8231		Pentium III, Celeron, C3	66/100/133 MHz	No	SDRAM	100/133 MHz	1.5 GB	No	2.2	No	No	Yes (Trident Blade3D)
Apollo PLE133T		VT8601T	VT82C686B, VT8231	May 30, 2001	Pentium III, Pentium III Tualatin, Celeron, C3	66/100/133 MHz	No	SDRAM	66/100/133 MHz	1.5 GB	No	2.2	No	No	Yes (Trident Blade3D)
ProSavage PL133T		VT8604	VT82C686A/B	May 30, 2001	Pentium III, Pentium II	66/100/133 MHz	No	PC100/PC133 SDRAM, VCSDRAM	66/100/133 MHz	2.0 GB		2.1	No	No	Yes (ProSavage™)
ProSavage PL133		VT8604	VT82C686A/B		Pentium III, Pentium II	66/100/133 MHz	No	PC100/PC133 SDRAM, VCSDRAM	66/100/133 MHz	2.0 GB		2.1	No	No	Yes (ProSavage™)
ProSavage PM133		VT8605	VT82C686A/B	December 1999	Pentium III, Pentium II	66/100/133 MHz	No	PC100/PC133 SDRAM, VCSDRAM	66/100/133 MHz	2.0 GB		2.1	No	4x	Yes (ProSavage™)
CLE266 (Castle Rock)		VT8622/3	VT8233A, VT8235M, VT8235	Dec 2001	Pentium III, Celeron, Pentium III Tualatin, C3	66/100/133 MHz	No	SDRAM DDR 200/266	100/133 MHz	2.0 GB	No	2.1	266 MB/s	No	Yes

- ProSavage PM133 - graphics core from S3, derived from a combination of the 3D component of Savage4 and 2D from Savage 2000.
- PLE133 and PLE133T - graphics core from Trident, derived from Blade3D.
- CLE266 (Castle Rock) - graphics core from S3, derived from S3 Savage series under the brand name UniChrome.
- Asus advertised some boards as Apollo Pro 133Z. 133Z appears to be a late revision of or step up from 133A, but it is not listed on the VIA site.

=== Slot A and Socket A ===
Chipset	Part numbers	South bridge	Release date	Processors	FSB	Memory types	Memory bus	Max. memory	V-Link	AGP	IGP
Apollo KX133	VT8371	VT82C686A	February 2000	Athlon (Slot A)	200 MHz	SDR SDRAM, VCSDRAM	SDR 100/133 MHz	2.0 GB	No	4×	
Apollo KT133	VT8363	VT82C686A/B	June 2000	Athlon, Duron (Socket A)	200 MHz	SDR SDRAM, VCSDRAM	SDR 100/133 MHz	1.5 GB	No	4×	
ProSavage KM133	VT8365	VT82C686A/B, VT8231	December 2000	Athlon, Duron (Socket A)	200 MHz	SDR SDRAM, VCSDRAM	SDR 100/133 MHz	1.5 GB	No	4×	Yes (ProSavage™)
ProSavage KL133	VT8364	VT82C686A/B	December 2000	Athlon, Duron (Socket A)	200 MHz	SDR SDRAM, VCSDRAM	SDR 100/133 MHz	1.5 GB	No	No	Yes (ProSavage™)
Apollo KT133A	VT8363A	VT82C686B, VT8231	December 2000	Athlon, Athlon XP, Duron (Socket A)	200/266 MHz	SDR SDRAM, VCSDRAM	SDR 100/133 MHz	1.5 GB	No	4×	
ProSavage KM133A	VT8365A	VT82C686B	2001	Athlon, Athlon XP, Duron (Socket A)	200/266 MHz	SDR SDRAM, VCSDRAM	SDR 100/133 MHz	1.5 GB	No	4×	Yes (ProSavage™)
ProSavage KL133A	VT8364A	VT82C686B	2001	Athlon, Athlon XP, Duron (Socket A)	200/266 MHz	SDR SDRAM, VCSDRAM	SDR 100/133 MHz	1.5 GB	No	No	Yes (ProSavage™)
Apollo KT133E	VT8363E	VT82C686B	April 2001	Athlon, Duron (Socket A)	200 MHz	SDR SDRAM, VCSDRAM	SDR 100/133 MHz	1.5 GB	No	4×	
Apollo KT266	VT8366	VT8233	April 2001	Athlon, Athlon XP, Duron (Socket A)	200/266 MHz	SDR SDRAM, DDR SDRAM	SDR 100/133 MHz DDR 200/266 MHz	4.0 GB	266 MB/s	4×	
Apollo KLE133	VT8361	VT82C686B, VT8231	June 2001	Athlon, Duron (Socket A)	200/266 MHz	SDR SDRAM, VCSDRAM	SDR 100/133 MHz	1.0 GB	No	No	Yes (Trident Blade3D)
Apollo KT266A	VT8366A	VT8233, VT8233A, VT8235	September 2001	Athlon, Athlon XP, Duron (Socket A)	200/266 MHz	SDR SDRAM, DDR SDRAM	SDR 100/133 MHz DDR 200/266 MHz	4.0 GB	266 MB/s	4×	
ProSavageDDR KM266	VT8375	VT8233, VT8235	January 2002	Athlon, Athlon XP, Duron (Socket A)	200/266 MHz	SDR SDRAM, DDR SDRAM	SDR 100/133 MHz DDR 200/266 MHz	4.0 GB	266 MB/s	4×	Yes (ProSavage8™ DDR)
KM266 Pro		VT8235, VT8237, VT8237R(+)		Athlon, Athlon XP, Duron, Sempron (Socket A)	200/266/333 MHz	DDR SDRAM	DDR 200/266/333 MHz	4.0 GB	266 MB/s	4×	Yes (ProSavage8™ DDR)
Apollo KT333	VT8367	VT8233A, VT8235	Feb 2002	Athlon, Athlon XP, Duron, Sempron (Socket A)	200/266/333* MHz	DDR SDRAM	DDR 200/266/333 MHz	4.0 GB	266/533* MB/s	4×	
Apollo KT400	VT8368	VT8235, VT8237, VT8237R(+)	September 2002	Athlon, Athlon XP, Duron, Sempron (Socket A)	200/266/333 MHz	DDR SDRAM	DDR 200/266/333 MHz	4.0 GB	533 MB/s	8×	
Apollo KT400A	VT8377A	VT8235, VT8237, VT8237R(+), VT8251	March 2003	Athlon, Athlon XP, Duron, Sempron (Socket A)	200/266/333 MHz	DDR SDRAM	DDR 200/266/333/400 MHz	4.0 GB	533 MB/s	8×	
UniChrome KM400	VT8378	VT8235, VT8237, VT8237R(+)	April 2003	Athlon, Athlon XP, Duron, Sempron (Socket A)	200/266/333 MHz	DDR SDRAM	DDR 200/266/333 MHz	4.0 GB	533 MB/s	8×	Yes (VIA UniChrome IGP)
Apollo KT600	VT8377	VT8237, VT8237R(+), VT8251	June 2003	Athlon, Athlon XP, Duron, Sempron (Socket A)	200/266/333/400 MHz	DDR SDRAM	DDR 200/266/333/400 MHz	4.0 GB	533 MB/s	8×	
UniChrome KM400A		VT8237, VT8237R(+), VT8251	June 2003	Athlon, Athlon XP, Duron, Sempron (Socket A)	200/266/333/400 MHz	DDR SDRAM	DDR 200/266/333/400 MHz	4.0 GB	533 MB/s	8×	Yes (VIA UniChrome IGP)
KT880	VT8379	VT8237, VT8237R(+), VT8251	Feb 2004	Athlon, Athlon XP, Duron, Sempron (Socket A)	200/266/333/400 MHz	DDR SDRAM	Dual Channel DDR 200/266/333/400 MHz	4.0 GB	533 MB/s	8×	

- KT266 contains a hardware bug which causes system instability when using the AGP slot at the specified max capacity of 4×.
- ProSavage KM133, KM133A, KM266, KM400, KM400A - Similar to the above, but with integrated graphics. After KM133, DDR is supported. The KM133 uses an IGP consisting of the S3 Savage4 3D core and Savage 2000 2D functionality. KM266's ProSavage8 IGP is similar but has an additional 3D pipeline. The KM400 chipset and its "A" variant use the VIA UniChrome IGP. KM400A supports FSB 400 unlike the KT400A
- Later revisions of the KT333 (sometimes called KT333CF) are rebadged KT400 chips with AGP 8x disabled. On motherboards with this chipset AGP 2x cards which require 3.3V are not supported, V-Link works at 533 MB/s and there is official support for 333 MHz FSB.
- KT133E is a cut-down/cost-reduced version of the KT133A without official support for 133 MHz FSB. It was develeoped to replace the original KT133 when it went out of production.

=== Socket 423, 478 and LGA 775 ===
Chipset	Part numbers	South bridge	Release date	Socket	Processors	FSB	Memory types	Memory bus	Max. memory	V-Link	AGP	PCI-E	IGP
P4X266	VT8753	VT8233/8233C	Aug 2001	Socket 423 Socket 478	Pentium 4, Celeron	400 MHz	SDR SDRAM, DDR SDRAM	SDR 100/133 MHz DDR 200/266 MHz	4.0 GB	266 MB/s	4×	No	No
P4M266	VT8751	VT8233/8233A/8233C		Socket 478	Pentium 4, Celeron	400 MHz	SDR SDRAM, DDR SDRAM	SDR 100/133 MHz DDR 200/266 MHz	4.0 GB	266 MB/s	4×	No	Yes (ProSavage8™ DDR)
P4X266E	VT8753	VT8233/8233C		Socket 478	Pentium 4, Celeron, Celeron D	400/533 MHz	SDR SDRAM, DDR SDRAM	SDR 100/133 MHz DDR 200/266 MHz	4.0 GB	266 MBs	4×	No	No
P4X266A	VT8753	VT8233/8233A/8233C	Dec 2001	Socket 478	Pentium 4, Celeron	400/533 MHz	SDR SDRAM, DDR SDRAM	SDR 100/133 MHz DDR 200/266 MHz	4.0 GB	266 MB/s	4×	No	No
P4M266A		VT8233, VT8235		Socket 478	Pentium 4, Celeron	400/533 MHz	SDR SDRAM, DDR SDRAM	SDR 100/133 MHz DDR 200/266 MHz	4.0 GB	266 MB/s	4×	No	Yes (ProSavage8™ DDR)
P4X333	VT8754	VIA VT8235	May 2002	Socket 478	Pentium 4, Celeron, Celeron D	400/533 MHz	SDR SDRAM, DDR SDRAM	SDR 100/133 MHz DDR 200/266/333 MHz	4.0 GB	533 MB/s	8×	No	No
P4X400	VT8754	VIA VT8235		Socket 478	Pentium 4, Celeron, Celeron D	400/533 MHz	DDR SDRAM	DDR 200/266/333/400 MHz	4.0 GB	533 MB/s	8×	No	No
P4X533		VT8237, VT8237R(+)		Socket 478	Pentium 4, Celeron, Celeron D	400/533 MHz	DDR SDRAM	DDR 200/266/333/400 MHz	4.0 GB	533 MB/s	8×	No	No
PT800	VT	VT8237, VT8237R(+)	Jul 2003	Socket 478 LGA 775	Pentium 4, Celeron, Celeron D	400/533/800 MHz	DDR SDRAM	DDR 200/266/333/400 MHz	3.0 GB	533 MB/s	8x	No	No
PM800	VT	VT8237, VT8237R(+)	Nov 2003	Socket 478 LGA 775	Pentium 4, Celeron, Celeron D	400/533/800 MHz	DDR SDRAM	DDR 200/266/333/400 MHz	3.0 GB	1066 MB/s	8x	No	Yes (VIA UniChrome IGP)
PT880	VT	VT8237, VT8237R(+)	Nov 2003	Socket 478 LGA 775	Pentium 4, Celeron, Celeron D	400/533/800 MHz	Dual Channel DDR SDRAM	DDR 200/266/333/400 MHz	4.0 GB	1066 MB/s	8x	No	No
PM880	VT	VT8237, VT8237R(+)	Nov 2003	Socket 478 LGA 775	Pentium 4, Celeron, Celeron D	400/533/800 MHz	Dual Channel DDR SDRAM	DDR 200/266/333/400 MHz	4.0 GB	1066 MB/s	8x	No	Yes (VIA UniChrome IGP)
P4M800	VT	VT8237, VT8237R(+), VT8251	Oct 2004 (Announced) Feb 2005 (Available)	Socket 478 LGA 775	Pentium 4, Pentium D, Celeron, Celeron D	400/533/800 MHz	DDR SDRAM	DDR 200/266/333/400 MHz	3.0 GB	533 MB/s	8x	No	Yes (VIA UniChrome IGP)
P4M800 Pro	VT3344	VT8237, VT8237R(+), VT8251	Sept 2005	Socket 478 LGA 775	Pentium 4, Pentium D, Celeron, Celeron D, Core 2	400/533/800/1066 MHz	DDR SDRAM DDR2 SDRAM	DDR 200/266/333/400 MHz DDR2 400/533 MHz	2.0 GB	533 MB/s	8x	No	Yes (VIA UniChrome IGP)
PT880 Pro	VT	VT8237, VT8237R(+)	Jan 2005	Socket 478 LGA 775	Pentium 4, Pentium D, Celeron, Celeron D, Core 2	400/533/800 MHz	Dual Channel DDR SDRAM Dual Channel DDR2 SDRAM	DDR 200/266/333/400 MHz DDR2 400/533 MHz	4.0 GB	1066 MB/s	8x	x4	No
PT880 Ultra	VT	VT8237, VT8237R(+), VT8237A, VT8237S	Jan 2005	LGA 775	Pentium 4, Pentium D, Celeron, Celeron D, Core 2	533/800/1066 MHz	Dual Channel DDR SDRAM Dual Channel DDR2 SDRAM	DDR 266/333/400 MHz DDR2 400/533/667 MHz	4.0 GB	1066 MB/s	8x	x4	No
PT894	VT	VT8237, VT8237R(+)	Jan 2005	LGA 775	Pentium 4, Pentium D, Celeron, Celeron D	533/800/1066 MHz	Dual Channel DDR SDRAM Dual Channel DDR2 SDRAM	DDR 266/333/400 MHz DDR2 400/533/667 MHz	4.0 GB	1066 MB/s	No	x16	No
PT894 Pro	VT	VT8237, VT8237R(+)	Jan 2005	LGA 775	Pentium 4, Pentium D, Celeron, Celeron D	533/800/1066 MHz	Dual Channel DDR SDRAM Dual Channel DDR2 SDRAM	DDR 266/333/400 MHz DDR2 400/533/667 MHz	4.0 GB	1066 MB/s	No	x16	No
P4M890	VT	VT8237, VT8237R(+), VT8237A	Feb 2006	Socket 478 LGA 775	Pentium 4, Pentium D, Celeron, Celeron D, Core 2	400/533/800 MHz	DDR SDRAM DDR2 SDRAM	DDR 266/333/400 MHz DDR2 400/533/667 MHz	4.0 GB	533 MB/s	No	x16	Yes (VIA UniChrome IGP)
PT890	VT	VT8237, VT8237R(+), VT8237A, VT8251	Apr 2006	LGA 775	Pentium 4, Pentium D, Celeron, Celeron D, Core 2	533/800 MHz	DDR SDRAM DDR2 SDRAM	DDR 266/333/400 MHz DDR2 400/533/667 MHz	4.0 GB	533 MB/s	No	x16	No
P4M900	VT	VT8237R(+), VT8237A, VT8237S, VT8251	May 2006	Socket 478 LGA 775	Pentium 4, Pentium D, Celeron, Celeron D, Core 2	400/533/800/1066 MHz	DDR SDRAM DDR2 SDRAM	DDR 266/333/400 MHz DDR2 400/533/667 MHz	4.0 GB	1066 MB/s	No	x16	Yes (VIA Chrome9 HC IGP)
PT900	VT	VT8237, VT8237R(+), VT8237A	May 2006	LGA 775	Pentium 4, Pentium D, Celeron, Celeron D, Core 2	533/800/1066 MHz	DDR SDRAM DDR2 SDRAM	DDR 266/333/400 MHz DDR2 400/533/667 MHz	4.0 GB	1066 MB/s	No	x16	No

- Being a reduced version of PM880, PM800 is not as closely related to PT800 as P4M890 to PT890. Because of its high cost, It is soon obsoleted in favor of P4M800 and then P4M800 Pro, both of which have a lower rated V-Link and feature no special memory technology such as FastStream64 or StepUp that is common in the other listed 8xx chipsets.
- VIA PT890, P4M890, PT900, P4M900 – VIA's PCIe-only chipsets. The P4M chipsets have onboard graphics VIA UniChrome Pro.
- VIA Chipsets P4 Series for Intel CPU Comparison Chart

=== Socket 754, 939, 940, AM2 ===
Chipset	IGP Part number	South bridge	Release date	Processors	Max. FSB	SMP	V-Link	AGP	PCI-Express	IGP
K8T800	VT	VT8235, VT8237, VT8237R(+), VT8251	Apr 2003	Socket 754/939/940	800 MHz	Yes	533 MB/s	8x	No	No
K8M800	VT3108	VT8237, VT8237R(+), VT8251	Dec 2003	Socket 754/939/AM2	800 MHz	No	533 MB/s	8x	No	Yes (VIA UniChrome IGP)
K8T800 Pro	VT	VT8237, VT8237R(+), VT8251	May 2004	Socket 754/939/940	1 GHz	Yes	1066 MB/s	8x	No	No
K8T890	VT	VT8237, VT8237R(+), VT8251	Sept 2004	Socket 939/AM2	1 GHz	No	1066 MB/s	No	x16	No
K8M890	VT3230	VT8237, VT8237R(+), VT8251	Oct 2005	Socket 754/939/AM2	1 GHz	No	1066 MB/s	No	x16	Yes (VIA Chrome9 IGP)
K8T900	VT	VT8237, VT8237R(+), VT8251	Nov 2005	Socket 939/AM2	1 GHz	No	1066 MB/s	No	x16, Dual x8	No

- VIA K8M890, K8T890, K8T900 – VIA's PCIe-only chipsets.
- The K8M800 chipsets has the onboard graphics VIA UniChrome Pro; the K8M890 has the Chrome9.
- The Athlon 64 chipsets do not have memory controllers, because memory controller is integrated into the CPU. Supported memory types depend on the CPU and socket used.
- VIA Chipsets K8 Series for AMD CPU Comparison Chart
- The K8M890 was also used on boards with Socket 754, like the ASUS K8V-VM Ultra

=== Chipsets supporting both VIA and Intel processors ===
Chipset (Northbridge) V = Mobile C = Desktop	Internal Unichrome IGP Part number	IGP	South bridge	Release date	Processors	FSB	Memory types	Memory bus	Max. memory	V-Link	PCI	AGP	PCI-e	Audio
CN400	VT3118	VIA UniChrome Pro	VT8237R	Mar 2004	VIA C3/C3-M/Eden/Eden-N	100/133/200 MHz	DDR SDRAM	up to 400 MHz	4GB	Ultra V-Link (1GB/s)	SB	4×/8×	No	SB (VIA Vinyl Audio)
CX700	VT3157	VIA UniChrome Pro II	(single-chip solution)	Jul 2006	Intel Pentium M/VIA C7-M/C7-M ULV	533/400 MHz	DDR2/DDR SDRAM	up to 533/400 MHz	2GB	NA - (single-chip solution)	4	No	No	VIA Vinyl HD Audio
CN700	VT3344	VIA UniChrome Pro	VT8237A/VT8251	2006	VIA C7	533/400 MHz	DDR2/DDR SDRAM	up to 533/400 MHz	2GB	533 MB/s	SB	8×	No	SB (VIA Vinyl Audio)
VN800	VT3344	VIA UniChrome Pro	VT8237A	Aug 2005	VIA C7-M / Intel Pentium M Socket-479 / Yonah - Socket-M	533/400 MHz	DDR2 SDRAM	400 or 533 MHz	4GB 1 GB *	533 MB/s		8×	No	SB (VIA Vinyl Audio)
CN800	VT3225	VIA UniChrome Pro	VT8237R Plus	Nov 2006	VIA C7/C7-D	533/400 MHz	DDR2/DDR SDRAM	up to 533/400 MHz	4GB	533 MB/s	SB	No	×16-1 ×1-1	SB (VIA Vinyl Audio)
CN896	VT3371	VIA Chrome9 HC	VT8237S/VT8251	Feb 2007	VIA C7/C7-D/Eden (V4)	800/400 MHz	DDR2/DDR SDRAM	up to 667/400 MHz	4GB	Ultra V-Link (1GB/s)	SB	No	×16-1 ×1-1	SB (VIA Vinyl HD Audio)
VX800	VT	VIA Chrome9 HC3	(single-chip solution)	Apr 2008	VIA Nano/C7/Eden	800/400 MHz	DDR2 SDRAM	up to 667 MHz	4GB	NA - (single-chip solution)	4	No	×4-1 ×1-2	VIA Vinyl HD Audio
VX855	μMSP2	VIA Chrome9 HCM	(single-chip solution)	Mar 2009	VIA Nano/C7/Eden	800/400 MHz	DDR2 SDRAM	up to 800 MHz	4GB	NA - (single-chip solution)	No	No	No	VIA Vinyl HD Audio
VN1000	VT	VIA Chrome 520	VT8261	Dec 2010	VIA Nano/C7/C7-D/Eden (V4)	800/400 MHz	DDR2/DDR3 SDRAM	up to 800/1066 MHz	16GB	Ultra V-Link (1GB/s)	SB	No	×8-1 ×1-4	SB (VIA Vinyl HD Audio)

- VIA VX700 - Supports VIA C7-M or C7-ULV 533/400 MHz FSB
  - DDR2 533/400/333 or DDR400/333
  - Utilizes the VIA UniChrome Pro II Integrated Graphics Processor (IGP)
- VIA VN800 – Supports VIA C7-M / Intel Pentium M / Celeron M, and Yonah (Core Solo and Core Duo) Processors
  - VIA UniChrome Pro Integrated Graphics Processor (200 MHz core clock)
  - DirectX 7
  - Support product: (VIA EPIA -VB6002G Mini-ITX Board)
  - * - Cited in marketing literature as supporting up to 4 GB DDR2 SDRAM; only supported up to 1 GB DDR2 max actual per memory-slot. Motherboards with 1-slot support 1 GB-max; motherboards with 2-slots support 2 GB-max, etc.
- VIA VN896 (Mobile) and VIA CN896 (Desktop).
  - VIA VN896(Mobile) can support Intel Pentium M / Celeron M, Core Solo / Core Duo, and Core2 Duo Processors
  - Support product: (BenQ Joybook R42)
- VIA VX800
  - First VIA mobile chipset to support DirectX 9.0 (Pixel Shader 2.0)
  - VIA Chrome9 HC3 Integrated Graphics Processor (250 MHz engine clock, up to 256 MB frame buffer)
  - Built-in VIA Vinyl HD Audio controller supporting up to eight high-definition channels with a 192 kHz sampling rate and 32-bit sample depth
  - Supports 400/800 MHz FSB
  - Supports up to 4 GB of RAM with two 64-bit DDR2-667 DIMMs
  - Single-chip solution (no southbridge or V-Link required)
  - Designed towards being used with the VIA Isaiah 64-bit processor.
  - Maximum power consumption (TDP max) of 5 watts.
- VIA VX800U
  - Similar to the VIA VX800
  - VIA Chrome9 HC3 integrated graphics (166 MHz engine clock, up to 256 MB frame buffer)
  - Supports a 400 MT/s FSB
  - Supports up to 4GBs of RAM with two 64-bit DDR2-400 DIMMs
  - Does not support PCIe or SATA due to their power requirements
  - Maximum power consumption of 3.5 watts
  - Intended for very low-power devices
- VIA VX855
  - Full hardware acceleration of H.264, MPEG-2 and WMV9
  - Single-chip solution (no southbridge or V-Link required)
  - Maximum power consumption of 2.3 watts
- VIA VN1000
  - DirectX 10.1
  - 32 stream processors and 4 sampling units, supports Shader Model 4, OpenGL 3.0 and OpenCL 1.0 for GPGPU applications.
  - Acceleration of Blu-ray, MPEG-2, WMV-HD, VC-1 and H.264

=== Chipsets supporting VIA processors ===
Chipset	Part numbers	South bridge	Release date	Processors	FSB	Memory types	Memory bus	Max. memory	V-Link	PCI	AGP	PCI-e	USB		IGP	Audio	TDP
Chipset	Part numbers	South bridge	Release date	Processors	FSB	Memory types	Memory bus	Max. memory	V-Link	PCI	AGP	PCI-e	2.0	3.0	IGP	Audio	TDP
VX900	VT	(single-chip solution)	Mar 2010	VIA Nano/X2/QuadCore/C7/Eden	400-1066 MT/s	DDR2/DDR3 SDRAM	up to 800 MHz/ 1066 MHz	8 GB (4GB per Module)	NA - (single-chip solution)	Yes	No	×8-1 ×1-3	8 +1 Device port	N/A	VIA Chrome9 HD	VIA Vinyl HD Audio	4.5W
VX11H	VT	(single-chip solution)	Aug 2012	VIA Nano/X2/QuadCore/C7/C7-D/Eden (V4)	533-1066 MT/s	DDR3 SDRAM	up to 1333 MHz	16 GB	NA - (single-chip solution)	Yes	No	×4-1 x1-2 or ×2-1 x1-4	6	3 (1 shared as Device port)	VIA Chrome 645/640	VIA Vinyl HD Audio	5.8W

- VIA VX900
  - Similar to VX855, but more expansion options
- VIA VX11/H
  - First VIA chipset built on the 40 nm CMOS process
  - Maximum power consumption of 5.8 watts
  - DDR3-1333 memory with maximum memory capacity of 16 GB
  - Integrated ChromotionTM 5.0 DX11 2D/3D graphics & video processor
  - DirectX 11, OpenGL 3.2.
  - Acceleration of Blu-ray, MPEG-2, WMV-HD, VC-1 and H.264
  - A card reader interface with support for MMC, MS Pro HG, and SDHC/SDXC

== Southbridge chips ==
VIA's PCI Southbridges could be combined with any manufacturer's Northbridge using a PCI interconnect. The V-Link Southbridges could be used only with a VIA V-Link Northbridge.

Part number	PATA	SATA	RAID	North Bridge interconnect	PCI	PCI-e	USB	Audio	Modem	Ethernet MAC	Integrated super I/O
VT82C586	4 ATA-33	No	No	PCI			1.1			No	No
VT82C586A	4 ATA-33	No	No	PCI			1.1			No	No
VT82C586B	4 ATA-33	No	No	PCI			1.1			No	No
VT82C596A	4 ATA-33	No	No	PCI			1.1			No	No
VT82C596B	4 ATA-66	No	No	PCI			1.1			No	No
VT82C686A	4 ATA-66	No	No	PCI			4 1.1	AC'97 & Sound Blaster	Yes	No	Yes
VT82C686B	4 ATA-100	No	No	PCI			4 1.1	AC'97 & Sound Blaster	Yes	No	Yes
VT8231	4 ATA-100	No	No	PCI			4 1.1	AC'97 & Sound Blaster	Yes	VIA 10/100 Ethernet or HomePNA (NOT ON ALL)	Yes
VT8233	4 ATA-100	No	No	4× V-Link 266 MB/s	5		6 1.1	AC'97	Yes	VIA 10/100 (not on all/earlier)	No
VT8233A	4 ATA-133	No	No	4× V-Link 266 MB/s	5		4 1.1	AC'97	Yes	No	No
VT8233C	4 ATA-100	No	No	4× V-Link 266 MB/s	5		6 1.1	AC'97	Yes (NOT ON ALL)	3Com 10/100 (NOT ON ALL)	No
VT8235	4 ATA-133	No	No	8× V-Link 533 MB/s	5		6 2.0	AC'97	Yes	VIA 10/100	No
VT8237 (R+)	4 ATA-133	2 SATA-150, SATALite*	(SATA) RAID 0, 1, 0+1* & JBOD	8× V-Link 533 MB/s / Ultra V-Link (1GB/s)	5		8 2.0	AC'97	Yes	VIA 10/100	No
VT8237A	4 ATA-133	2 SATA-150, SATALite*	(SATA) RAID 0, 1, 0+1* & JBOD	Ultra V-Link (1GB/s)	5		8 2.0	HD Audio	Yes	VIA 10/100	No
VT8237S*	4 ATA133	2 SATA-II, SATALite*	(SATA) RAID 0, 1, 0+1* & JBOD	Ultra V-Link (1GB/s)	5		8 2.0	HD Audio	Yes	VIA 10/100	No
VT8251	4 ATA-133	4 SATA-II	(SATA) RAID 0, 1, 0+1* & JBOD	Ultra V-Link (1GB/s)	7	×1-2	8 2.0	HD Audio	Yes	VIA 10/100	No
VT8261	2 ATA-133	4 SATA-II	No	Ultra V-Link (1GB/s)	5		12 2.0	HD Audio	Yes	VIA 10/100/1000	No

- The VT82C686A/B and VT8231 support hardware Sound Blaster Pro compatible sampled sound, and FM synthesis emulation through use of a TSR.
- The SATALite interface allows for two additional SATA devices (4 total) with use of a PHY chip which occupies the secondary PATA channel. It is required for RAID 0+1 on VT8237R Plus.
- The VT8237 and VT8237R do not support SATA speed autonegotiation and will not work with SATA-II or III drives unless the drive has a compatibility mode jumper set. The VT8237R Plus supports SATA II drives but only at the 150 MB/S speed.
- The SATA-II feature of VT8237S is limited to 300 MB/S Data Transfer Rate bearing no NCQ functionality.
- Motherboards frequently had VIA companion chips for added functionality such as better audio (8 channel), more/faster USB (i.e. USB 2.0 for VT8233), or Gigabit Ethernet.
- The software modem is supported through a MC'97 or HD Audio codec chip and requires external components to implement the electrical connection to the telephone line. This circuitry could be included on the motherboard directly but was typically added through a communications riser slot.
- The chipset integrated Ethernet MAC requires an additional PHY chip. Some vendors opted to add a MAC and PHY from a different manufacturer instead of using the chipset's built in capability.

== Hardware bugs ==
The KT133 chipset could corrupt disk transfers; specifically, the 686B Southbridge had issues with Creative's SBLive! sound cards. A BIOS update was released by VIA to fix this issue; however, it is not known if all motherboards with 686Bs had their BIOSes updated. The KT266 contains a hardware bug which can cause system instability when using the AGP slot at the 4× speed.

== See also ==
- S3 Chrome
- S3 Savage
- Comparison of AMD chipsets
- Comparison of ATI chipsets
- List of Intel chipsets
- Comparison of Nvidia chipsets
