= Chrome S20 series =

Graphics accelerator by S3 Graphics

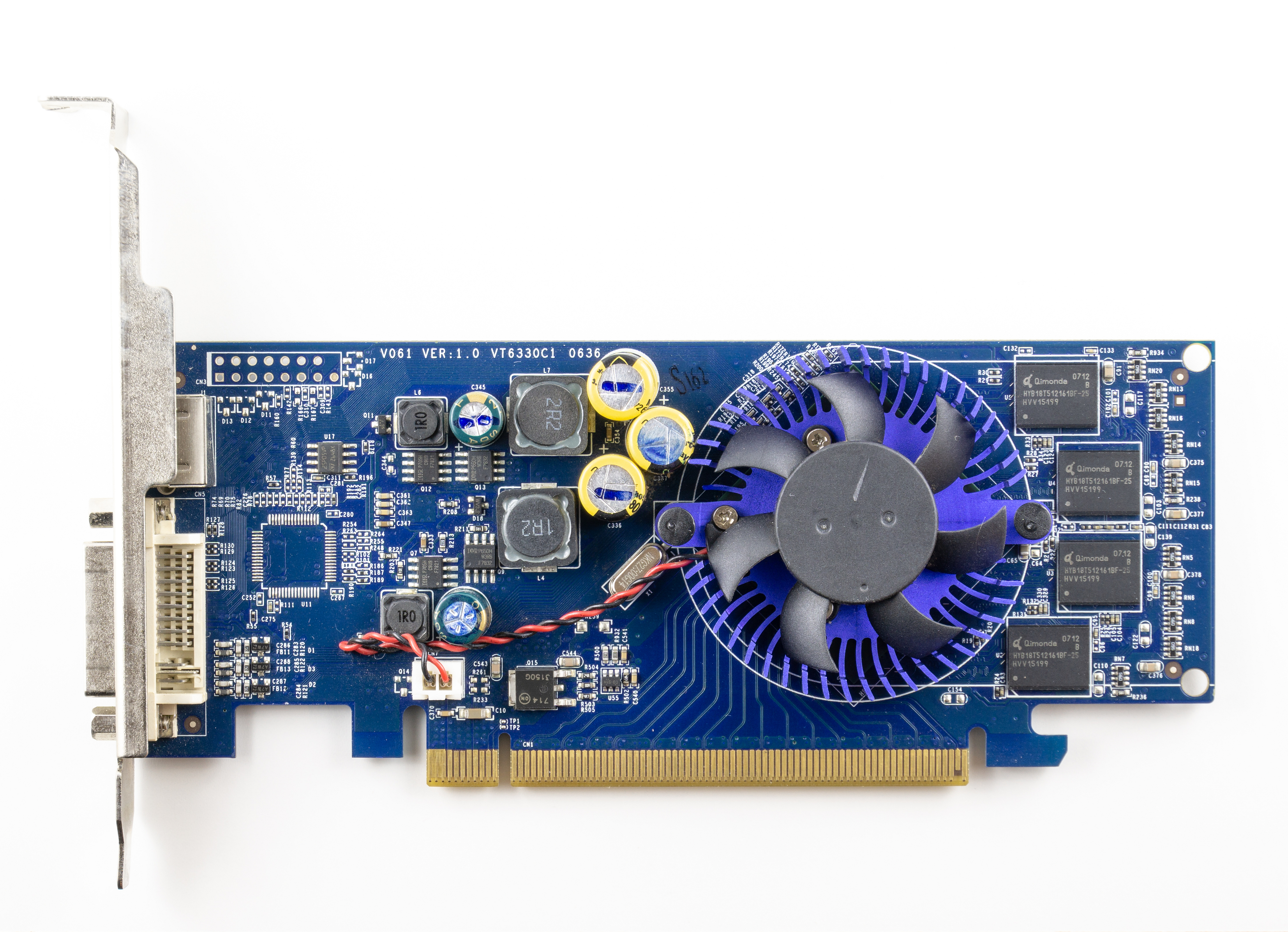
Chrome S25 graphics card, using an S20 series chip

Chrome 20 Series is a series of graphics accelerators by S3 Graphics. It was the successor of the GammaChrome S18 chip.

== Overview ==
The Chrome 20 series was introduced on March 11, 2005, with the Chrome S25 and Chrome S27 as launch products. The S20 was marketed to the low and mid range of the graphics card market, similar to the PCI Express version of the GammaChrome S18 that preceded it. The Chromotion 3 Video Engine and low power consumption were main selling points.

The S20 series marked S3's first products utilizing Fujitsu's 90 nm process. This enabled a significant increase in clock speeds over prior S3 products, and the Chrome 20 series could use 32-256MiB GDDR1 or GDDR3 memory at maximum of 700 MHz, or 64-512MiB GDDR2 memory at a maximum of 500 MHz. The S20 was also S3's first GDDR3 enabled product - with the memory interface supporting 32, 64, or 128-bit of GDDR1, GDDR2 or GDDR3 memory.

Similar to Radeon X1000 series, texturing units and raster operators are separated from pixel shaders. Chrome 20 has 4 vertex shaders, 8 pixel shaders, 4 texturing units, 4 raster operators.

Display controller now integrates a single-link TMDS transmitter, with support of dual-link using external transmitters.

Other new features supports the multi-GPU technology MultiChrome and AcceleRAM.

== Chromotion 3.0 ==
This revision of Chromotion Engine adds support of nonlinear video scaling, commonly used by wide screen television sets. TV encoder now supports 18 DTV ATSC formats:

Vertical Lines	Pxels	Aspect Ratio	Picture Rate
1080	1920	16:9	60i, 30p, 24p
720	1280	16:9	60i, 30p, 24p
480	704	16:9 and 4:3	60p, 60i, 30p, 24p
480	640	4:3	60p, 60i, 30p, 24p

== MultiChrome ==
MultiChrome is a technique to couple multiple graphics chips for better performance. It was first used in the Chrome S20 series and later in Chrome 400 series graphics processors. The methods used by MultiChome are Alternate frame rendering and Split Frame Rendering. The technology is comparable to NVidia's SLI and ATi/AMD's Crossfire multi video adapter solution.

At the moment, due to the speed of the Chrome S20 and Chrome 400 chipsets, no special connectors are required to bridge both cards to activate MultiChrome. Also, unlike NVidia or ATi's solution, the technology is not locked to a particular chipset.

== AcceleRAM ==
AcceleRAM feature allows the graphics card to cache data to the system memory if more is needed, similar to HyperMemory.

== Chrome S27 ==
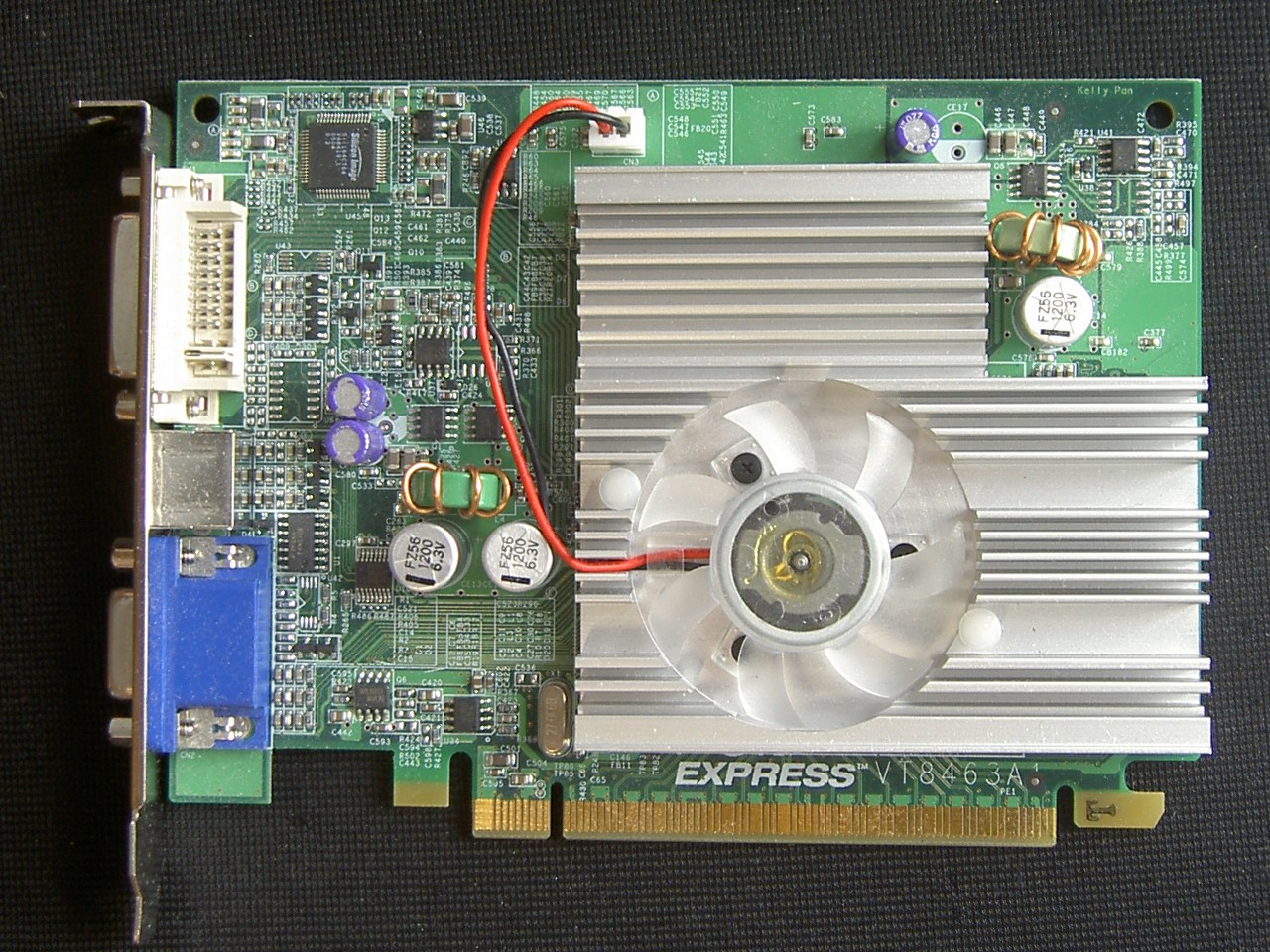
S3 Chrome S27JE

Chrome S27 is the highest-specification model in the Chrome S20 series. Another main selling point is its low power consumption and thus heat output even with comparison to similarly targeted graphics cards from NVIDIA and ATI, using only about 24 watts of power during maximum 3D graphics load. Its memory uses either DDR1, DDR2 or GDDR3 with 128mb or 256mb flavours. The core runs at 700 MHz.

== Retail products ==
As of May 2006, most of the Chrome S27s available in retail are made by S3 Graphics itself. The Chrome S27 was sold at the company's own GStore where it was sold alongside a 128MiB version and a Gammachrome S18 Pro and certain online retailers like Newegg. They could be bought as a 256mb DDR2 (clocked at 800 MHz) version in China under the Axper brand and a 256MiB DDR3 (clocked at 1200 MHz version in Japan under the brand XIAi.

Although S3 graphics did not sell Chrome S25 video cards, they could be found under the Xiai brand in Japan and the Axper brand in China. Both the Japanese and Chinese S25 cards have their GPU clockspeed and memory clocked 100 mHz higher than the default specification giving a 700 MHz memory and 500 MHz GPU clock speeds.

== Clock Speed Record ==
The Chrome S27 in May 2006, held the record for the highest GPU clockspeed of 700 MHz. However, performance does not depend on clock speed alone allowing it to be beaten by lower clocked cards.
