= S3 Chrome =

Graphics accelerator

S3 Graphics' Chrome series of graphics accelerators arrived in 2004 with the DeltaChrome line of chips. They were supplied as discrete, mobile, or integrated graphics.

== Overview ==
Chrome S27 logo

In 2004 after the S3 Graphics company spun off their joint-venture with VIA, VIA attempted to re-launch the S3 Graphics brand with a new line of video cards under the name 'Chrome'. The Chrome range featured low power requirements and high-definition output making it attractive for small form factor scenarios and OEM systems. Unfortunately by the time Chrome released, the rapid progression of 3D gaming performance between rivals NVIDIA and ATI Technologies made S3's offerings uncompetitive in the lucrative high end consumer market.

The Chrome series supports Direct3D 9 with full pixel shader 2.0 support, excluding the unreleased Savage XP/AlphaChrome and early UniChrome. Later GPUs in the series offer Direct3D 10, 10.1, and 11 support, depending on the GPU.

S3's AcceleRAM technology allowed system RAM to be used to supplement the video card's RAM, and is similar to ATI's HyperMemory and NVIDIA's TurboCache. Chrome also introduced MultiChrome technology, allowing multiple matched Chrome cards to be used simultaneously in a system to increase graphics performance, similar to ATI CrossFire and NVIDIA's SLI.

== Product Families ==
- AlphaChrome

Unreleased - the first of the 'Chrome' product line, previously titled Savage XP and codenamed Zoetrope.

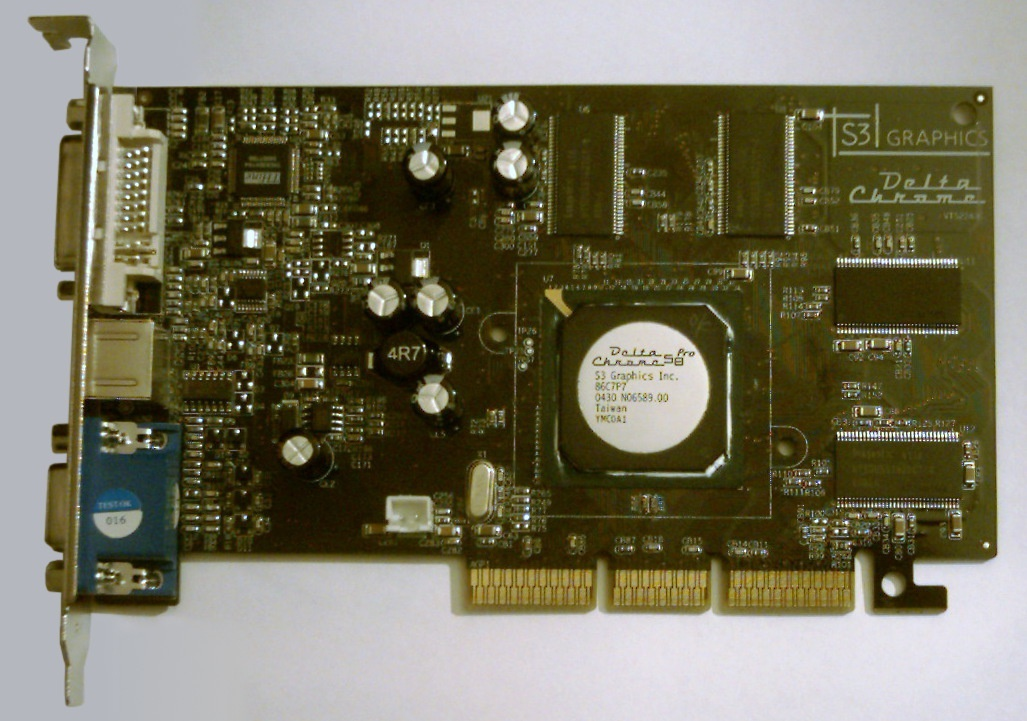
S3 Deltachrome S8 video card (the cooler was removed in this photo to expose the graphics chip)

- DeltaChrome

DeltaChrome added support for Shader Model 2.0, making it S3 Graphics' first released DirectX 9 product. Other features included the introduction of the Chromotion Video Engine, and dual 400 MHz DACs for multi monitor support.

- OmniChrome

OmniChrome is a video card with DeltaChrome S4 Pro processor, Philips 1216/1236 TV tuner, Techwell video decoder.

- GammaChrome

GammaChrome is the first native PCI Express product line by S3 Graphics. It was originally announced on 2004-3-18 , but the product was not released until 2005-3-9. Marketed as 3rd generation DirectX 9 products competing against GeForce 6600 and Radeon X600, there is little change between it and the previous generation of product, except for the updated Chromotion 2.0 engine.

Review of the product showed it was comparable to the contemporary competitors at the market segment , but it was never able to gain a significant market share.

- GammaChrome S19

S3 Graphics originally planned GammaChrome S19 on its roadmap, but it was cancelled.

Model listing Chronological order

Chip	Code name	Vertex Shaders	Pipeline	Core clock (MHz)	Memory clock (MHz)	Memory interface width (bit)
GammaChrome S14	Matrix	4	4/4/4	375	300	64/128
GammaChrome S18	Metropolis	4	4/4/4	300-500	300-450	64/128
GammaChrome S19	Matrix	4	8/8/8	500	?	?

- Chrome S20

This generation of S3 Chrome was announced on 2005-9-7 , and released on 2005-11-3.

- S3 Graphics 2300E

It is an embedded version of Chrome S20. It addresses 256MiB 32/64-bit GDDR2 SDRAM at maximum 500 MHz.

- Chrome 400

VIA planned the production of 2 new graphics chips, Chrome 440 and 430, by the end of 2007. The Chrome 460 was to DirectX 10 and adopt a 90 nm process, while the Chrome 430 supports DirectX 10.1 and adopts a 65nm process. The Chrome 460 was ultimately canceled. The devices were initially manufactured by Fujitsu, but manufacturing issues at Fujitsu triggered moving the volume production to TSMC.

The 430 GT was released on 2008-03-20 in US market, while 440 GTX was released in 2008-05-30.

The production models are made in 65 nm process, supports DirectX 10.1, and uses PCI Express 2.0 interface. Chromotion engine now supports Variable length decoding, and dual-stream Blu-ray playback (440 GTX). Display unit includes 2 dual-link DVI transmitters with integrated HDMI (audio passthrough) and HDCP, an integrated dual channel LVDS transmitter, an integrated TV/HDTV encoder, and support for two analog CRTs. 440 GTX runs at 725 MHz core speed.

- Chrome 400 ULP

It is a mobile line for the Chrome 400. 430 ULP includes features in 430 GT, while 435 ULP and 440 ULP includes features in 440 GTX.

This product was released on 2008-09-24.

- S3 Graphics 4300E

It is the embedded version of S3 Graphics Chrome 430. It supports features found in Chrome 400 and later products. Using GDDR2 memory, it runs up to 300 MHz core speed, 500 MHz memory; in a GDDR3 setup, it runs up to 650 MHz core speed, 900 MHz memory. Display unit includes 2 dual-link DVI transmitters with integrated HDMI (with audio controller) and HDCP, an integrated LVDS transmitter, and support for 2 analog CRTs.

- Chrome 500

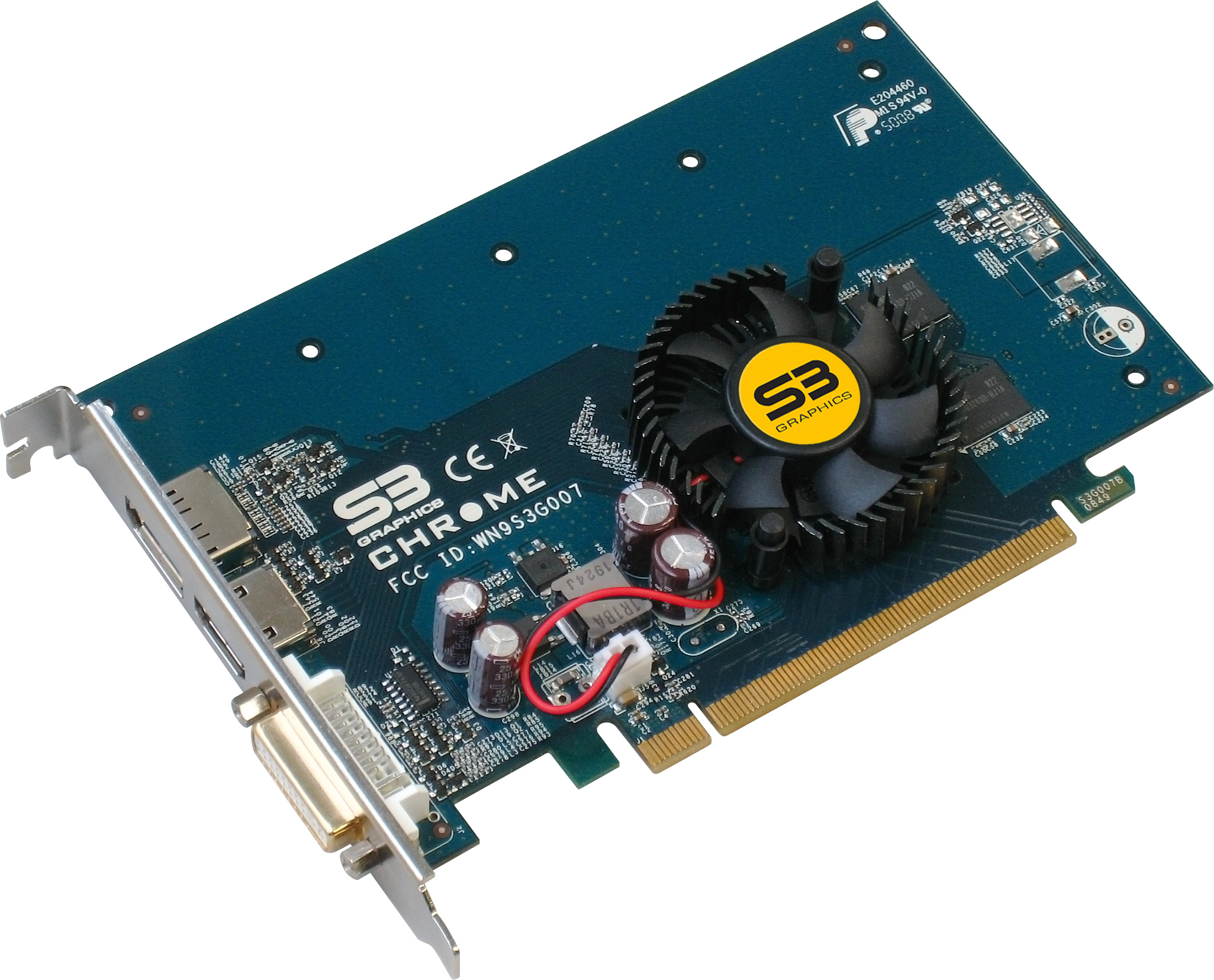
S3 Graphics Chrome 540 GTX with 256MiB Ram

Chrome 500 series includes integrated DisplayPort support, audio controller and an AES 128 encryption engine. The display unit loses 1 CRT and the TV encoder over Chrome 400. The audio controller supports Dolby 7.1 digital surround sound.

The first product, Chrome 530 GT, was released on 2008-11-20.

The second product, Chrome 540 GTX was officially released on 2009-02-12 even though the product was on sale on the Gstore since 2009-02-07. It featured a displayport and a full-sized PCB; a feature uncommon amongst more modern S3 Graphics Chrome cards.

- Chrome 520

This version is the first S3 Graphics derived graphics engine, since ProSavage8 DDR back in early 2000s, to be integrated into VIA Technologies chipset. The integrated graphics core is based on Chrome 500 series. Chrome 520 is the only known variant. VIA Technologies' VN1000 chipset contains this graphics engine. Very few units were actually sold.

- Chrome 645/640

This version is the first integrated graphics core based on the DirectX 11 cores. Known variants include Chrome 640 and Chrome 645, These newer IGPs are a part of VIA Technologies' VX11/H Media System Processor 4 (MSP4) and support Blu-ray Decoding (VX11H with HDPC only).

- Chrome 860

Zhaoxin KX-5000 (ZX-D) series contains Chrome 860 (ZX C-860) engine for their integrated graphics, mostly unchanged from Chrome 645 / 640.

- Chrome 960

Zhaoxin KX-6000 (ZX-E) series contains Chrome 960 (ZX C-960) engine for their integrated graphics. Added support for 4K resolution.

- Chrome 1080

Zhaoxin KX-6000G series contains Chrome 1080 (ZX C-1080) engine for their integrated graphics.

- Chrome 1190

Zhaoxin KX-7000 series contains Chrome 1190 (ZX C-1190) engine for their integrated graphics.

- UniChrome

UniChrome is an internally developed graphics engine called Halcyon (codename) used in VIA's integrated graphics chipsets. UniChrome is implemented in the VIA chipsets: CLE266, KM400(A) / KN400(A), and P4M800 (non-CE revision).

- UniChrome Pro Series

The UniChrome Pro Series consists of the UniChrome Pro and UniChrome Pro II. The UniChrome Pro is an update to UniChrome with an improved video-engine called Chromotion (MPEG2 decoder, adaptive De-Interlacing and video deblocking). It contains a 128-bit 3D graphics core providing DirectX 7 hardware support but without a Transform & Lightning (T&L) unit. UniChrome Pro II further adds support for hardware rotation. UniChrome Pro is implemented in the VIA chipsets: K8M800(A) / K8N800(A), P4M800 Pro / P4M800 CE / VN800 / CN700, PM800 / PM880 / PN800 / PN880 / CN400, P4M890 / P4N890 / CN800; UniChrome Pro II is implemented in the VIA chipsets: CX700(M / M2) and VX700.

- Chrome9

Chrome9 was VIA Technologies' attempt to pass Microsoft's Windows Vista Basic certification with their internally developed integrated graphics cores supporting DirectX 9. Known variants include Chrome9, Chrome9 HC, Chrome9 HC3, Chrome9 HCM, and Chrome9 HD; the last one supports HD video decode. The design is an evolved version of UniChrome Pro, with a revamped 3D engine supporting DirectX 9 Shader Model 2.0 / OpenGL 1.4 called Innovation (codename). Chrome9 HC3, Chrome9 HCM, and Chrome9 HD also contain a revamped 2D engine called M1 engine with hardware rotation support. The Chrome9 IGP (Integrated Graphics Processor) VIA chipsets family consists of: K8M890 / K8N890 chipsets (Chrome9), P4M900, VN896, and CN896 chipsets (Chrome9 HC), VX800 chipset (Chrome9 HC3), VX855 chipset (Chrome9 HCM), VX900 chipset (Chrome9 HD) with FullHD support.

== Model listing ==
Chronological order

Chip	Release	fab (nm)	Core clock (MHz)	Pipeline	Vertex shaders	Memory clock (MHz)	Memory interface width (bit)	Notes
Savage XP (AlphaChrome)	6/2002	150						DDR SDRAM. Unreleased.
DeltaChrome S4 Pro	mid-2004	130	300	4/4/4	2	300	128	Shader Model 2
DeltaChrome S8	mid-2004	130	300	8/8/8	4	300	128	Shader Model 2
DeltaChrome S8 Nitro	mid-2004	130	315	8/8/8	4	315	128	Shader Model 2
DeltaChrome S8 ULP	mid-2004	130	200	8/8/8	4	300	128	Shader Model 2
GammaChrome S18 CE	3/2005	130	400	4/4/4	4	300	128	Shader Model 2
GammaChrome S18 PRO	3/2005	130	300	4/4/4	4	300	128	Shader Model 2
Chrome S25	11/2005	90	600	4/8/8	4	400 (Max 500/500/700 for GDDR1/GDDR2/GDDR3 memory)	32/64/128	PCIe. GDDR1, GDDR2, GDDR3. AcceleRAM, MultiChrome.
Chrome S27	11/2005	90	700	4/8/8	4	700 (Max 500/500/700 for GDDR1/GDDR2/GDDR3 memory)	32/64/128	PCIe. GDDR1, GDDR2, GDDR3. AcceleRAM, MultiChrome.
Chrome 430 GT	2/2008	65	625; Shader clock at 900 MHz	Unified shader model (VS=PS=GS=32)	32	1000 (500 GDDR2)	64	DirectX 10.1, OpenGL 2.1, PCIe 2.0, Shader Model 4.1, AcceleRAM, MultiChrome, H.264, MPEG2, MPEG4, VC1, WMVHD, AVS
Chrome 440 GTX	5/30/2008	65	800; Shader clock at 1100 MHz	Unified shader model (VS=PS=GS=32)	32	1600 (800 GDDR3)	64	DirectX 10.1, OpenGL 2.1, PCIe 2.0, Shader Model 4.1, AcceleRAM, MultiChrome, H.264, MPEG2, MPEG4, VC1, WMVHD, AVS, features dual stream HD video playback and pip(picture in picture)
Chrome 530 GT	11/20/2008	65	625 core clock MHz	Unified shader model (VS=PS=GS=32)	32	1000 (500 GDDR2)	64	DirectX 10.1, OpenGL 3.0, PCIe 2.0, Shader Model 4.1, AcceleRAM, MultiChrome, H.264, MPEG2, MPEG4, VC1, WMVHD, AVS, features dual stream HD video playback and pip(picture in picture)
Chrome 540 GTX	02/07/2009	65	800 core clock MHz	Unified shader model (VS=PS=GS=32)	32	1700 (850 GDDR3)	64	DirectX 10.1, OpenGL 3.0, PCIe 2.0, Shader Model 4.1, AcceleRAM, MultiChrome, H.264, MPEG2, MPEG4, VC1, WMVHD, AVS, features dual stream HD video playback and pip(picture in picture), Displayport

== See also ==
- Free and open-source graphics device driver#S3 Graphics
- List of VIA chipsets
