= S3 Graphics =

Former U.S.-based computer graphics company

S3 Graphics, Ltd.
- Type: Subsidiary
- Industry: Computer hardware
- Founded: January 1989; 37 years ago
- Fate: Defunct or Merged
- Headquarters: Fremont, California, U.S.
- Key people: Dado Banatao; Ronald Yara
- Products: Video cards
- Parent: HTC
- Website: s3graphics.com at the Wayback Machine (archived 2017-01-04)

S3 Graphics, Ltd. was an American computer graphics company. The company sold the Trio, ViRGE, Savage, and Chrome series of graphics processors. Struggling against competition from 3dfx Interactive, ATI and Nvidia, it merged with hardware manufacturer Diamond Multimedia in 1999. The resulting company renamed itself to SONICblue Incorporated, and, two years later, the graphics portion was spun off into a new joint effort with VIA Technologies. The new company focused on the mobile graphics market. VIA Technologies' stake in S3 Graphics was purchased by HTC in 2011.

== History ==
Logo used from 1989 to 1997

S3 was founded and incorporated in January 1989 by Dado Banatao and Ronald Yara. It was named S3 as it was Banatao's third startup company.(Startup Number 3).

The company's first products were among the earliest graphical user interface (GUI) accelerators. These chips were popular with video card manufacturers, and its followup designs, including the Trio64, made strong inroads with OEMs. S3 took over the high end 2D market just prior to the popularity of 3D accelerators.

S3's first 3D accelerator chips, the ViRGE series, controlled half of the market early on but could not compete against the high end 3D accelerators from ATI, Nvidia, and 3Dfx. In some cases, the chips performed worse than software-based solutions without an accelerator. As S3 lost market share, its offerings competed in the mid-range market. Its next design, the Savage 3D, was released early and suffered from driver issues, but it introduced S3TC, which became an industry standard. S3 bought Number Nine's assets in 1999, then merged with Diamond Multimedia. The resulting company renamed itself SONICblue, refocused on consumer electronics, and sold its graphics business to VIA Technologies. Savage-derived chips were integrated into numerous VIA motherboard chipsets. Subsequent discrete derivations carried the brand names DeltaChrome and GammaChrome.

In July 2011, HTC Corporation announced it was buying VIA Technologies' stake in S3 Graphics, thus becoming the majority owner of S3 Graphics. In November, the United States International Trade Commission ruled against S3 in a patent dispute with Apple.

== Graphics controllers ==
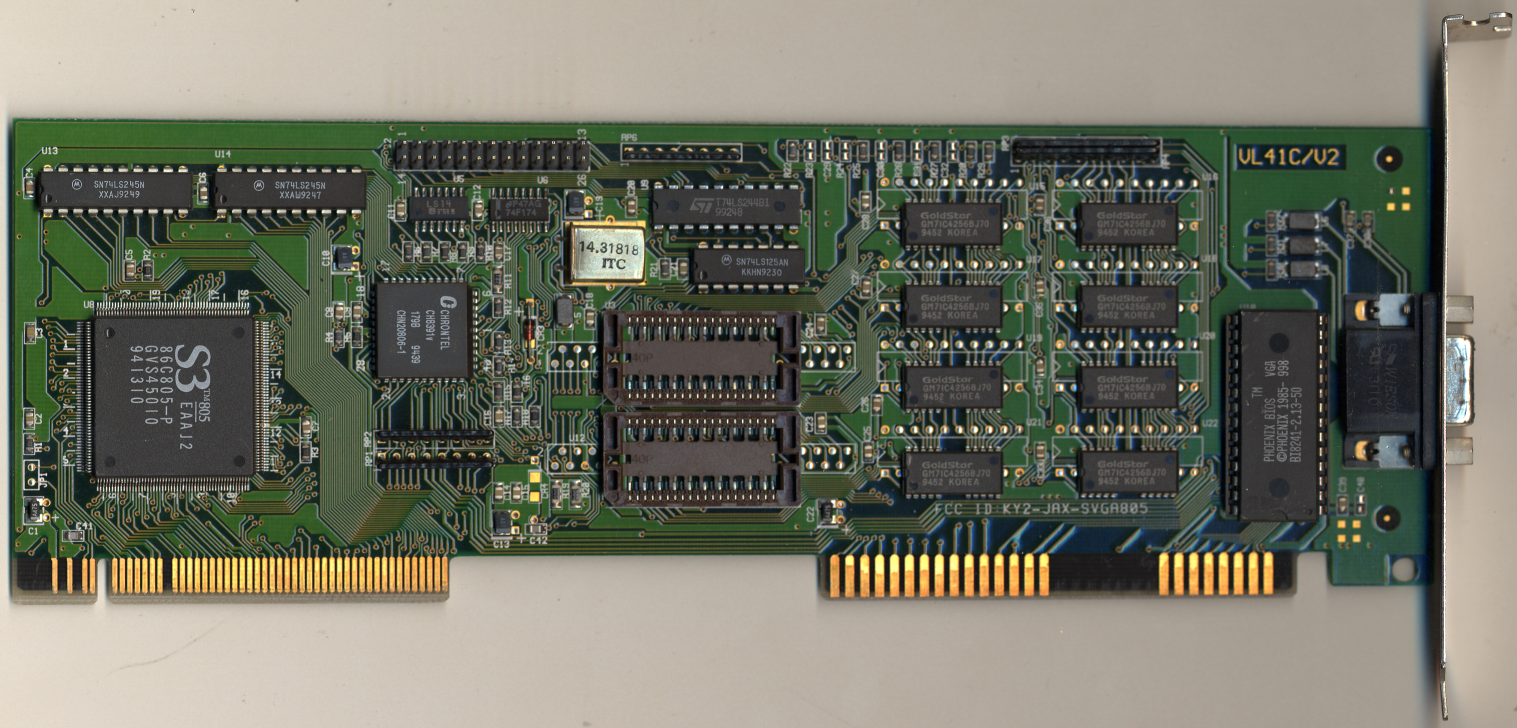
Jaton VL41C/V2, an example of a card using the S3 805 chip

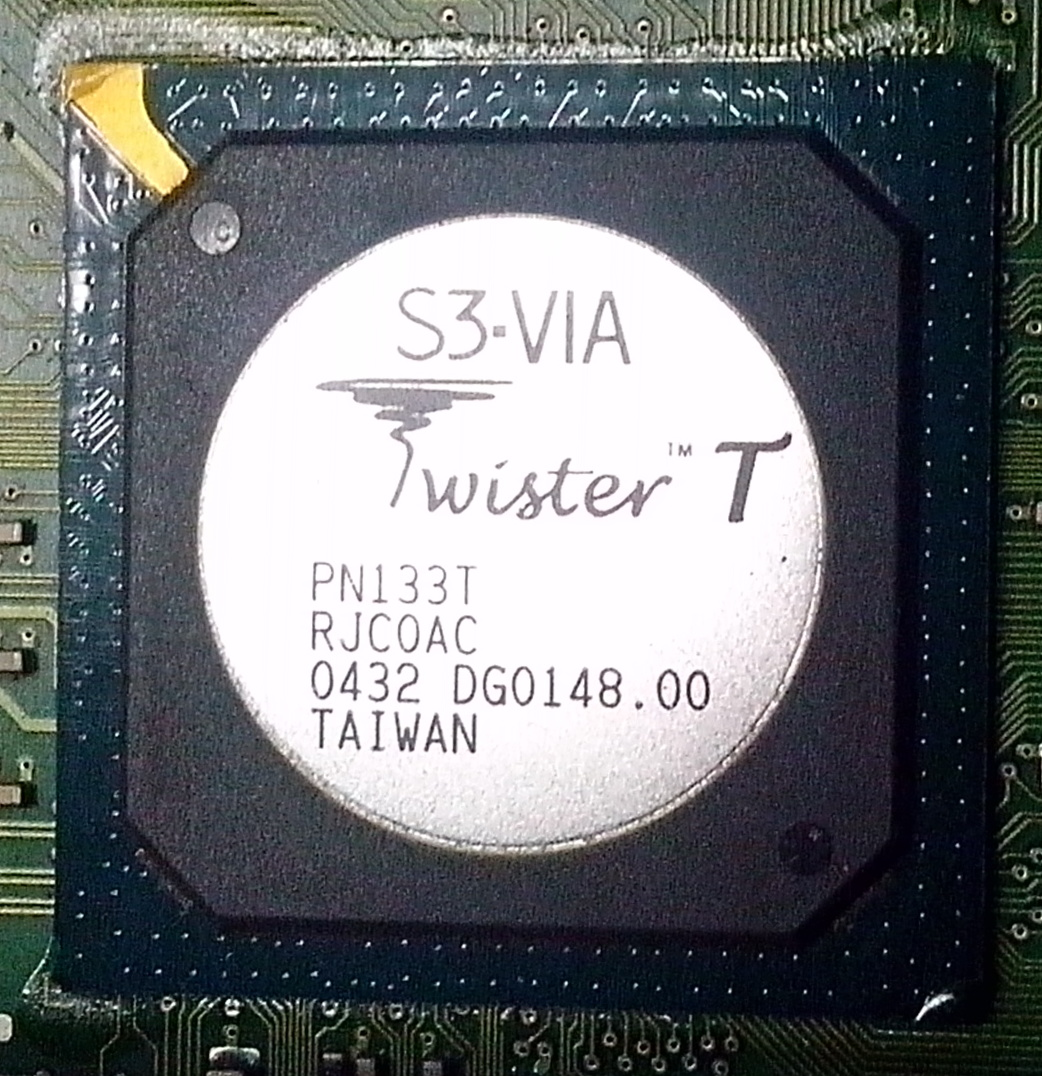
S3-VIA Twister T (PN133T chipset)

- S3 911, 911A (June 10, 1991) - S3's first Windows accelerators (16/256-color, high-color acceleration)
- S3 924 - 24-bit true-color acceleration
- S3 801, 805, 805i - mainstream DRAM VLB Windows accelerators (16/256-color, high-color acceleration)
- S3 928 - 24/32-bit true-color acceleration, DRAM or VRAM
- S3 805p, 928p - S3's first PCI support
- S3 Vision864, Vision964 (1994) - 2nd generation Windows accelerators (64-bit wide framebuffer). Support MPEG-1 video acceleration.
- S3 Vision868, Vision968 - S3's first motion video accelerator (zoom and YUV→RGB conversion)
- S3 Trio 32, 64, 64V+, 64V2 (1995) - S3's first integrated (RAMDAC+VGA) accelerator. The 64-bit versions were S3's most successful product range.
- ViRGE (no suffix), VX, DX, GX, GX2, Trio3D, Trio3D/2X - S3's first Windows 3D-accelerators. Notoriously poor 3D. Sold well to OEMs mainly because of low price and excellent 2D-performance.
- Savage 3D (1998), 4 (1999), 2000 (2000) - S3's first recognizably modern 3D hardware implementation. Poor yields meant actual clock speeds were 30% below expectations, and buggy drivers caused further problems. S3 Texture Compression went on to become an industry standard, and the Savage3D's DVD acceleration was market leading at introduction. Savage2000 was announced as the first chip with integrated Transformation and Lighting (S3TL) co-processor.
- Aurora64V+, S3 ViRGE/MX, SuperSavage, SavageXP - Mobile chipsets
- ProSavage, Twister, UniChrome, Chrome 9 - Integrated implementations of Savage chipset for VIA motherboards
- GammaChrome, DeltaChrome, Chrome 20 series, Chrome 440 series, Chrome 500 series - Discrete cards post acquisition by VIA.
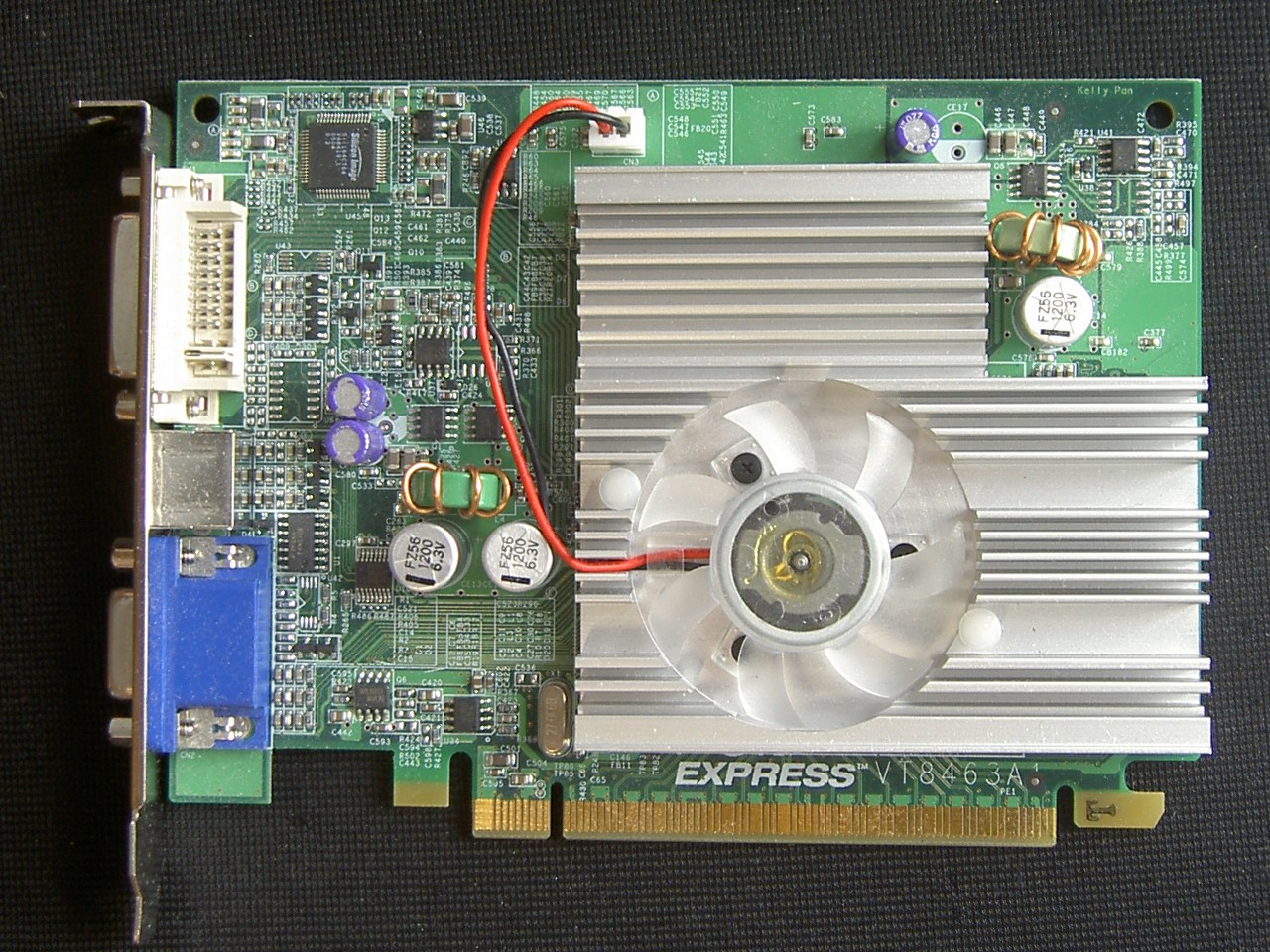
  The Chrome S27 of the Chrome 20 series
- S3 GenDAC, SDAC - VGA RAMDAC with high/true-color bypass (SDAC had integrated PLLs, dot-clocks, and hardware Windows cursor)

=== Media chipsets ===
- Sonic/AD sound chipset - A programmable, sigma-delta audio DAC, featuring an integrated PLL, stereo 16-bit analogue output
- SonicVibes - PCI Audio Accelerator
- Scenic/MX2 - MPEG Decoder
