= S3 Graphics Chrome 400 =

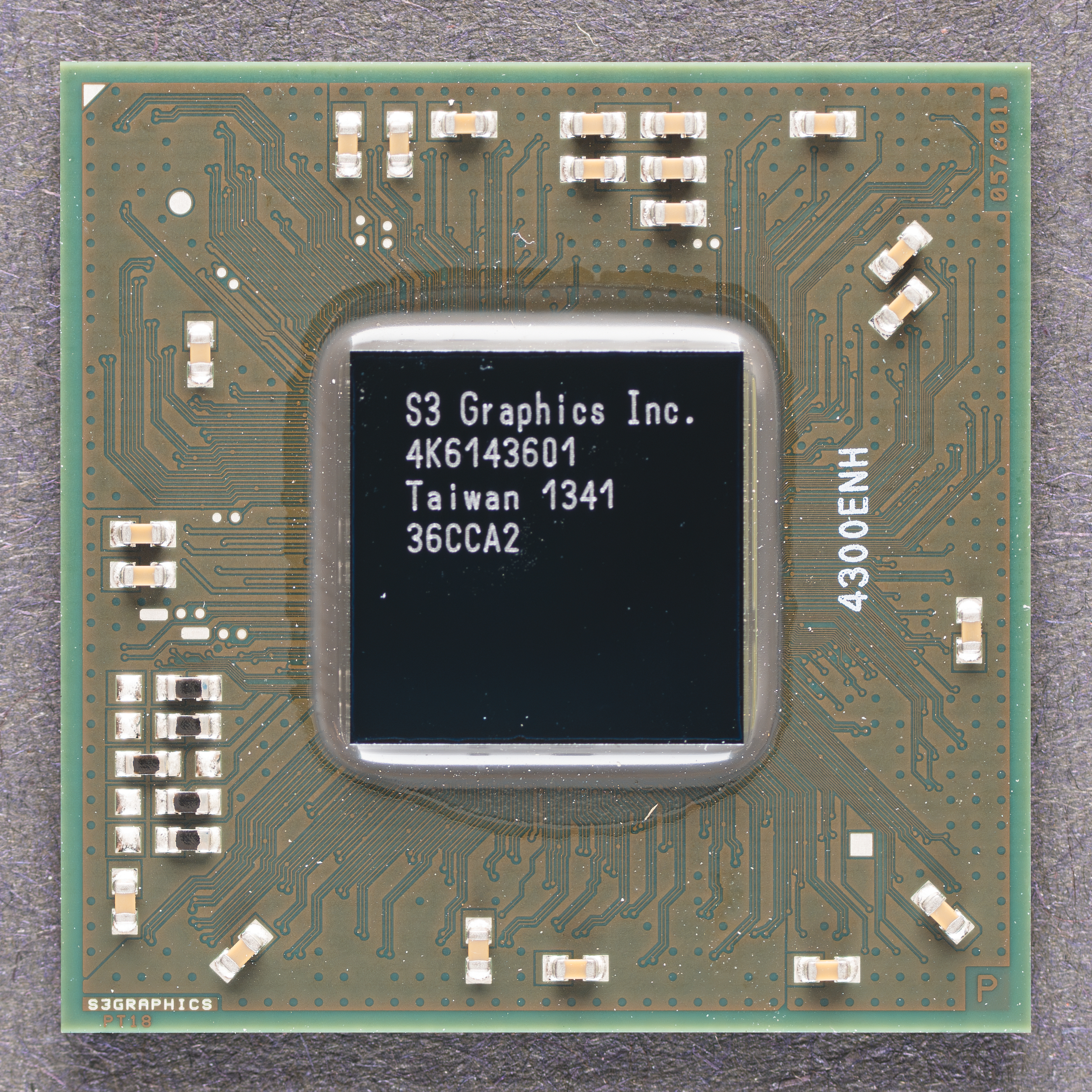
S3 Graphics Chrome 4300E, an embedded version of the Chrome 430, which is part of the Chrome 400 series.

S3 Graphics Chrome 400 is a series of computer graphics chips from VIA. It is the successor to the S3 Chrome S20 series.

== History ==
VIA had planned the production of two new graphics chips, Chrome 440 and 430, by the end of 2007. Both supported DirectX 10.1 using a 65 nanometer process. The Chrome 460 was planned to support DirectX 10 and use a 90 nanometer process, but was never released. The Chrome 400 series was codenamed 'Destination'. Both chips were manufactured by Fujitsu.

The 430 GT was released on 20 March, 2008 in the US market, while 440 GTX was released on 30 May of the same year.

== Features ==
The production models were made in 65 nm process, support DirectX 10.1, OpenGL 2.1, and use PCI Express 2.0 interface. Chrome engine supported variable-length decoding, and dual-stream Blu-ray playback (440 GTX). The display unit includes an HDMI port, a DVI port, and an analog VGA port. 440 GTX ran at a core speed of 725 MHz.

== Chrome 400 ULP ==
ULP was the mobile line for the Chrome 400. 430 ULP included features in 430 GT, while 435 ULP and 440 ULP includes features in 440 GTX.

This product was released on 24 September, 2008.

== Reception ==
In TechPowerUp's review of the 800/800 MHz core/memory version of S3 Graphics Chrome 440 GTX 256 MB video card, its performance was observed to be in the range of Radeon 3450 and GeForce 8500 GT. At a 1024×768 resolution, it was slightly slower than GeForce 9400 GT. Performance per dollar was the lowest of the list, while power consumption is on par with those products.
