= Apollo VP3 =

- CPU supported: Pentium; Pentium MMX; Cyrix 6x86 AMD K5; AMD K6; WinChip
- Socket supported: Socket 7
- Southbridge(s): VT82C586B

Miscellaneous
- Release date(s): November 1997
- Predecessor: Apollo VP2
- Successor: Apollo MVP3

Apollo VP3 (alias ETEQ 6628) is a x86 based Socket 7 chipset which was manufactured by VIA Technologies and was launched in 1997. On its time Apollo VP3 was a high performance, cost effective, and energy efficient chipset. It offered AGP support for Socket 7 processors which was not supported at that moment by Intel, SiS and ALi chipsets. In November 1997 FIC released motherboard PA-2012, which uses Apollo VP3 and has AGP bus. This was the first Socket 7 motherboard supporting AGP.

== Description ==
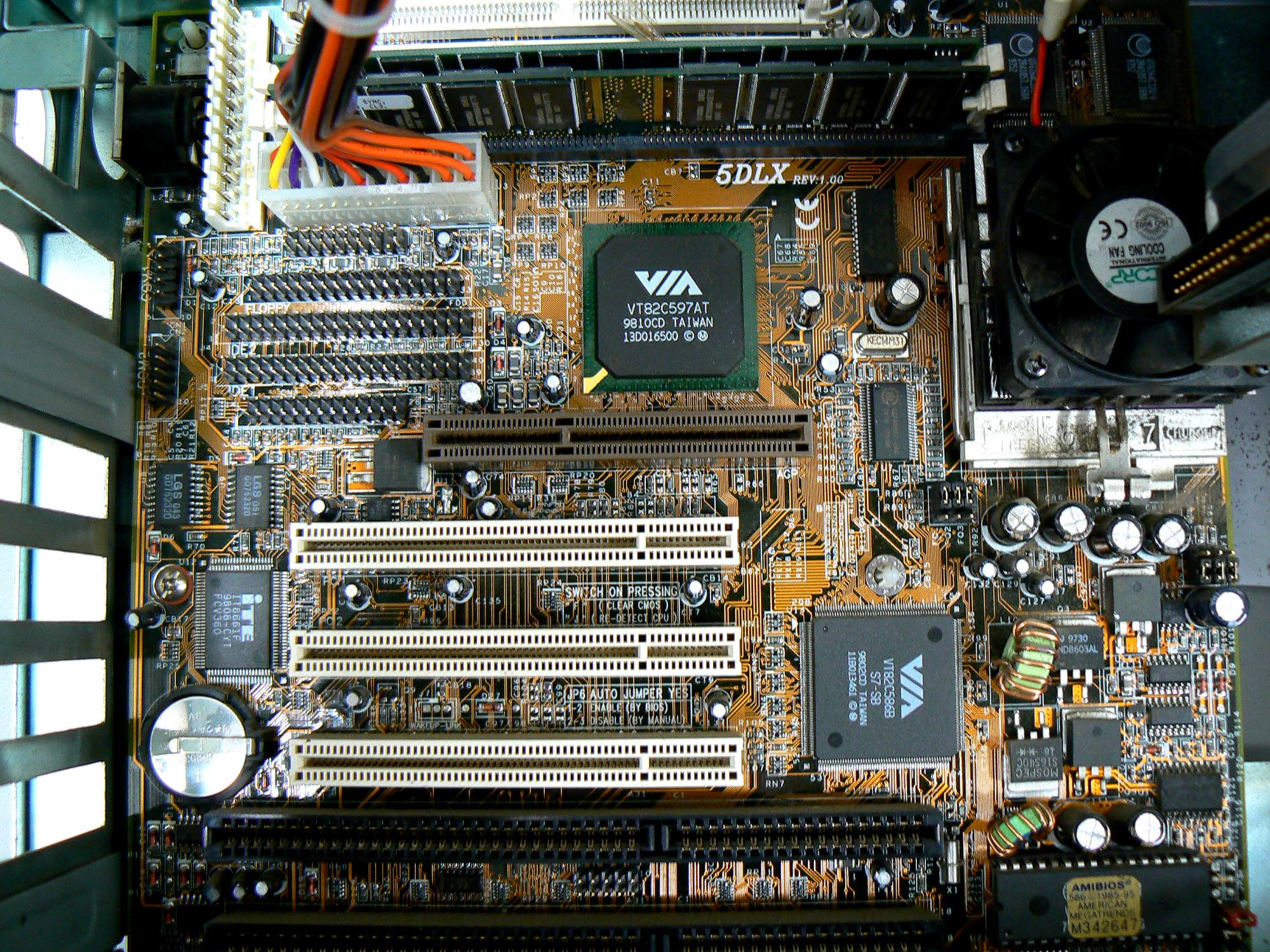
Zida Tomato 5DLX motherboard with VIA VP3 chipset (512 KB SRAM, 2 DIMM-s, 2 SIMM-s, 1 AGP, 3 PCI, 2 ISA )

Apollo VP3 supports 32 bits Socket 7 CPU-s, like Pentium, Pentium MMX, AMD K5, AMD K6, Cyrix 6x86, WinChip C2 and C6 CPU-s. It uses VT82C597 (or VT82C597AT for Baby AT and ATX motherboards) northbridge controller chip and AC97 compliant VT82C586B southbridge chip with ACPI power management system. VP3 has 64 bits memory bus; 32 bits 33 MHz PCI; 32 bits 66 MHz AGP 2X with sideband addressing, 133 MHz signalling and up to 533 MB/s transfer capability interfaces. It uses an integrated 10-bits TAG comparator and supports up to 2 MB pipelined burst synchronous SRAM (cache memory) and up to 1 GB ECC cachable RAM memory. Memory controller supports up to 8 memory pages (banks) interleaving mode, flexible row and column addresses, concurrent DRAM writeback, read around write capability, burst read and write operations, etc. (for more details see). Officially, the supported speeds of the memory bus are 50, 60 and 66 MHz, but the numerous implemented motherboards with VP3 have also 75 and even 83 MHz bus speed capability.

VT82C597 Northbridge supports up to six memory banks of DRAM-s or DIMM-s up to 1GB in total size. Memory controller supports standard fast page mode (FPM) DRAM, EDO-DRAM, Synchronous DRAM (SDRAM), and also SDRAM-II with Double Data Rate (DDR) in a flexible, mixed configuration. The Synchronous DRAM interface allows zero wait state bursting between the DRAM and the data buffers at 66 MHz. The six memory banks of DRAM can be used in arbitrary mixture of 1MB / 2MB / 4MB / 8MB / 16MBxN DRAM or DIMM modules. Memory controller has 3,3 V (5 V tolerant) interface.

VT82C586B includes UDMA-33 EIDE, USB, Keyboard/PS2-Mouse interfaces and on chip RTC plus 256 KB CMOS.

Anandtech described Apollo VP3 being a combination of the VIA Apollo VP2 and the Intel 440LX chipsets. Apollo VP3 was quite shortly replaced with VIA Apollo MVP3 chipset, which offers faster, 100 MHz memory bus capability and asynchronous memory bus, but supports somewhat less amount of the cachable memory area and system DRAM (only four memory banks). Lack of the 100 MHz bus support, which was needed for a newer AMD, Cyrix, etc., Super Socket 7 processors pushed VIA to drop VP3 from production.

== Apollo VP3 based motherboards ==
Majority of motherboards on the basis of Apollo VP3 chipset were implemented with 512 KB L2 cache memory, with single 32KB TAG-ram chip, and 2 (rarely 3) 168-pin DIMM slots plus 2 (rarely 4) 72-pin SIMM slots, with AGP slot, 2-4 PCI slots, 2-3 ISA slots. Some extremes are FIC PA-2012 and Shuttle HOT-595 which have 1024 KB (some have 512 KB) L2 cache memory and have three 168-pin DIMM slots (1 AGP, 4 PCI, 2 ISA). Tyan Trinity ATX S1592S has three 168-pin DIMM slots plus four 72-pin SO-DIMM slots (1 AGP, 4 PCI, 3 ISA).

Apollo VP3 chipset was sold by Soyo also under name ETEQ 6628 chipset.

== See also ==
- List of VIA chipsets
