= HyperMemory =

Brand by ATI

HyperMemory

HyperMemory was a brand for ATI's method of using the motherboard's main system RAM as part of or all of the video card's video memory on their line of Radeon video cards and motherboard chipsets. It relies on new fast data transfer mechanisms within PCI Express.

However, to make up for the inevitably slower system RAM with a video card, a small high-bandwidth local framebuffer is usually added to the video card itself. This can be noted by the one or two small RAM chips on these cards, which usually have a 32-bit or 64-bit bus to the GPU. This small local memory caches the most often needed data for quicker access, somewhat remedying the inherently high-latency connection to system RAM.

The local and system memory areas are not noticeably separate to the user and often HyperMemory solutions are advertised as having as much as 4096 MB RAM when this is actually referring to the potential use of system RAM.

HyperMemory offers significant cost reduction to low-end video cards because of the reduction in trace complexity on the video card PCB, and a reduction in the amount of RAM needed on the card. The solution offers excellent performance for 2D acceleration tasks while also maintaining adequate memory speed capable of playing some modern 3D game titles with reduced quality. A video card with HyperMemory typically is slower in 3D benchmarks than a similar video card which has its own discrete video memory.

Video cards implemented with HyperMemory usually bore the HM or LE suffix, for further details, see ATI Video Card Suffixes.

== See also ==
- TurboCache - similar technology by Nvidia
