= Graphics processing unit =

Specialized electronic circuit that accelerates graphics

The components of a GPU.

A graphics processing unit (GPU) is a specialized electronic circuit designed for digital image processing and to accelerate computer graphics, being present either as a component on a discrete graphics card or embedded on motherboards, mobile phones, personal computers, workstations, and game consoles. GPUs are also increasingly being used for non-graphical tasks, and have been used extensively for artificial intelligence (AI) processing and model training due to linear algebra acceleration, which is also used extensively in graphics processing.

Although there is no single definition of the term, and it may be used to describe any video display system, in modern use a GPU includes the ability to internally perform the calculations needed for various graphics tasks, like rotating and scaling 3D images, and often the additional ability to run custom programs known as shaders. This contrasts with earlier graphics controllers known as video display controllers which had no internal calculation capabilities, or blitters, which performed only basic memory movement operations. The modern GPU emerged during the 1990s, adding the ability to perform operations like drawing lines and text without CPU help, and later adding 3D functionality.

Graphics functions are generally independent and this lends these tasks to being implemented on separate calculation engines. Modern GPUs include hundreds, or thousands, of calculation units. This made them useful for non-graphic calculations involving embarrassingly parallel problems due to their parallel structure. The ability of GPUs to rapidly perform vast numbers of calculations has led to their adoption in diverse fields including artificial intelligence (AI) where they excel at handling data-intensive and computationally demanding tasks. Other non-graphical uses include the training of other neural networks, protein folding simulation, physics simulation, audio processing, drug development, and cryptocurrency mining.

== GPU companies ==
Many companies have produced GPUs under a number of brand names. In 2009, Intel, Nvidia, and AMD/ATI were the market share leaders, with 49.4%, 27.8%, and 20.6% market share respectively. In addition, Matrox while originally producing custom solutions, now customizes GPUs from Intel and AMD for workstation usage. Chinese companies such as Jingjia Micro have also produced GPUs for the domestic market although in terms of worldwide sales, they lag behind market leaders.

== Computational functions ==
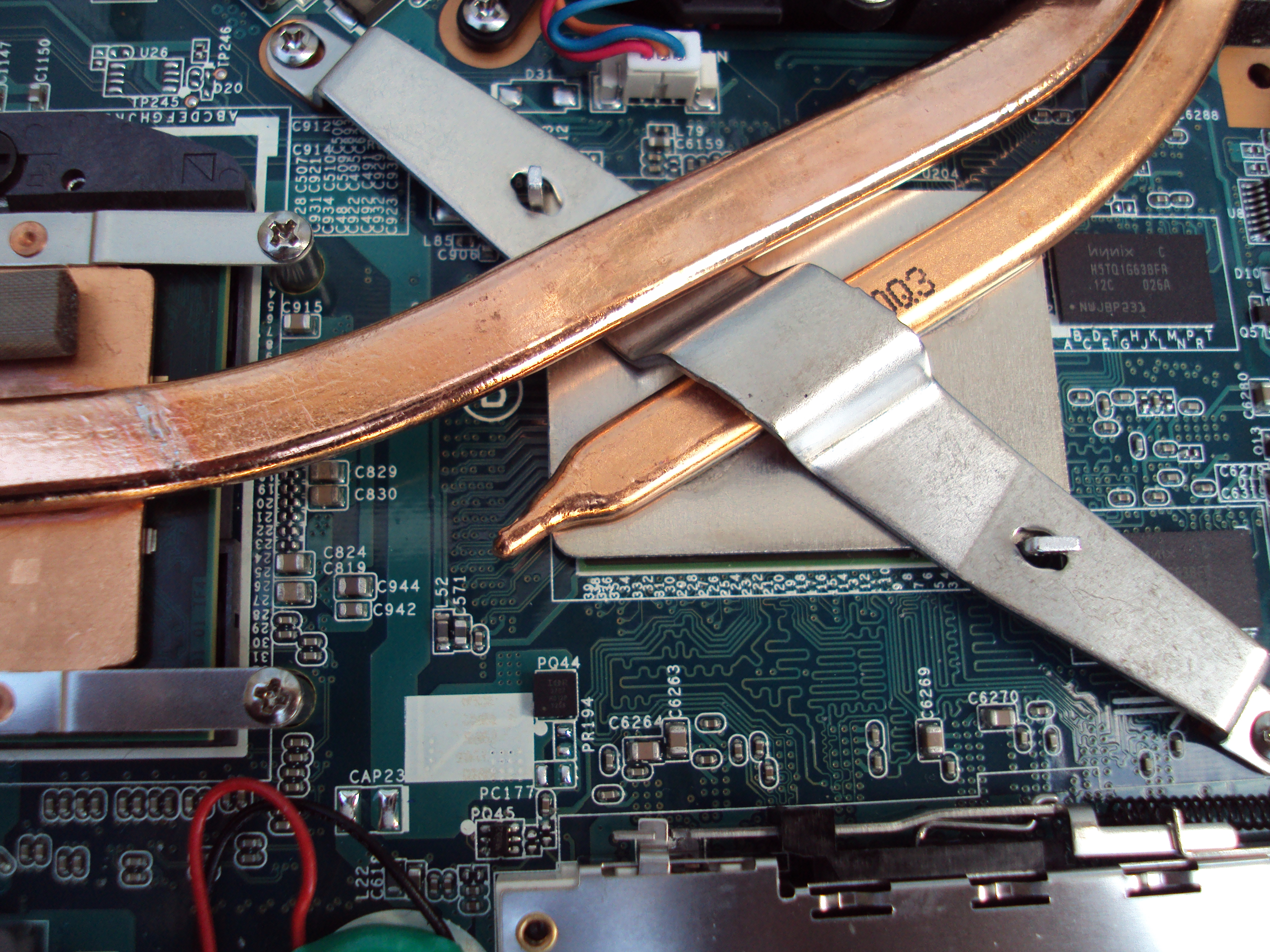
The ATI HD5470 GPU (above, with copper heatpipe attached) features UVD 2.1 which enables it to decode AVC and VC-1 video formats.

Several factors of GPU construction affect the performance of the card for real-time rendering, such as the size of the connector pathways in the semiconductor device fabrication, the clock signal frequency, and the number and size of various on-chip memory caches. Performance is also affected by the number of streaming multiprocessors (SM) for NVidia GPUs, or compute units (CU) for AMD GPUs, or Xe cores for Intel Xe-based GPUs, which describe the number of on-silicon processor core units within the GPU chip that perform the core calculations, typically working in parallel with other SM/CUs on the GPU. GPU performance is typically measured in floating point operations per second (FLOPS); Modern GPUs typically deliver performance measured in teraflops (TFLOPS). This is an estimated performance measure, and should not be treated as fact, as other factors can affect actual performance.

Modern GPUs also include dedicated hardware blocks for ray tracing, video encoding, and AI acceleration.

== GPU forms ==
In personal computers, there are two main forms of GPUs: dedicated graphics (also called discrete graphics) and integrated graphics (also called shared graphics solutions, integrated graphics processors (IGP), or unified memory architecture (UMA).

=== Dedicated graphics processing unit ===
Dedicated graphics processing units use on-board RAM that is dedicated to the GPU rather than relying on the computer's main system memory. This RAM is usually specially selected for the expected serial workload of the graphics card, such as GDDR SDRAM. This has massive performance benefits, but the caveat of "choking" when running out of dedicated memory, worsening performance.

Technologies such as Scalable Link Interface (SLI), NVLink, and CrossFire allow multiple GPUs to draw images simultaneously for a single screen, increasing the processing power available for graphics. These technologies, however, are increasingly uncommon; most games do not fully use multiple GPUs, as most users cannot afford them. Multiple GPUs are still used on supercomputers (such as in Summit); on workstations to accelerate video (processing multiple videos at once) and 3D rendering; for visual effects (VFX); general purpose graphics processing unit (GPGPU) workloads and for simulations, and in AI to expedite training, as is the case with Nvidia's lineup of DGX workstations and servers.

=== Integrated graphics processing unit ===
The position of an integrated GPU in a northbridge/southbridge system layout.

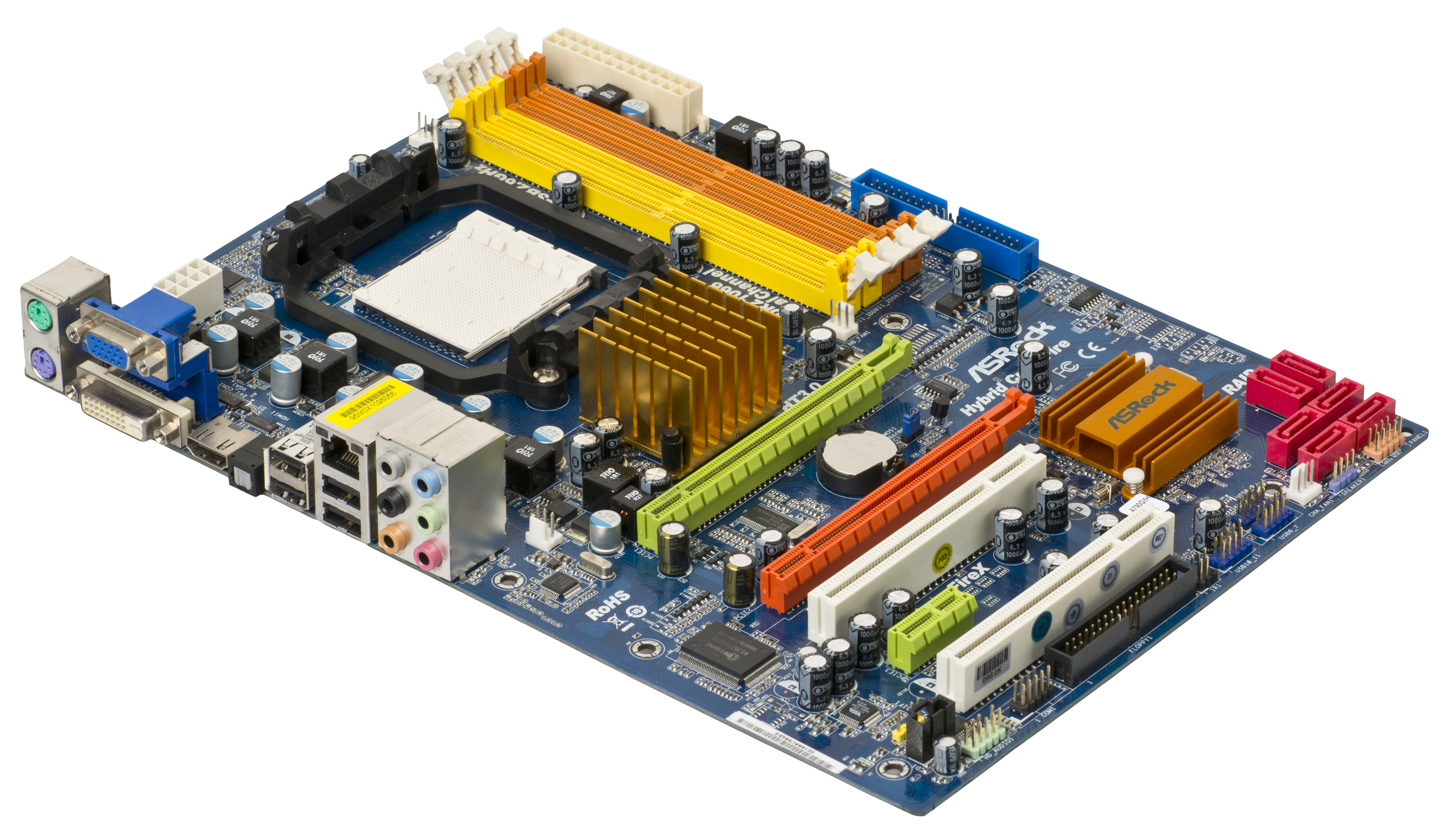
An ASRock motherboard with integrated graphics, which has HDMI, VGA and DVI-out ports.

An integrated graphics processing unit (iGPU) is a small GPU that is built directly onto the CPU. This allows the computer to handle basic visual tasks without the need for a dedicated graphics card, such as displaying graphical user interfaces (GUI), managing multi monitor outputs, playing high resolution videos, and playing video games with low graphics. While usually found in laptops primarily to save space and battery life, they can also be found in desktop computers to help reduce noise and energy costs.

Also called integrated graphics, shared graphics solutions, or integrated graphics processors (IGP), it uses a portion of a computer's system RAM rather than dedicated graphics memory. IGPs can be integrated onto a motherboard as part of its northbridge chipset, or on the same die (integrated circuit) with the CPU, such as Accelerated Processing Unit (AMD APU) or Intel HD Graphics. IGPUs and APUs are less costly to implement than dedicated graphics processing, but tend to be less capable. Integrated graphics processing was considered unfit for 3D games or graphically intensive programs but could run less intensive programs such as Adobe Flash. Examples of such IGPs would be offerings from SiS and VIA circa 2004. However, modern integrated graphics processors such as AMD Accelerated Processing Units and Intel Graphics Technology can even handle Triple A games at lower settings.

Because GPU computations are memory-intensive, integrated processing may compete with the CPU for relatively slow system RAM, as it has minimal or no dedicated video memory. IGPUs use system memory with bandwidth up to a current maximum of 128 gigabytes per second, whereas a discrete graphics card may have a bandwidth of more than 1000 gigabytes per second between its video random access memory (VRAM) and GPU core. This memory bus bandwidth can limit the performance of the IGPU, though multi-channel memory can mitigate this deficiency.

On systems with "Unified Memory Architecture" (UMA), including modern AMD processors with integrated graphics, modern Intel processors with integrated graphics, Apple processors, and modern consoles, the CPU cores and the GPU block share the same pool of RAM and memory address space.

=== Stream processing and general purpose GPUs (GPGPU) ===
It is common to use a general purpose graphics processing unit (GPGPU) as a modified form of stream processor or a vector processor, running compute kernels. This turns the massive computational power of a modern graphics accelerator's shader pipeline into general-purpose computing power. In certain applications requiring massive vector operations, this can yield several orders of magnitude higher performance than a conventional CPU. The two largest discrete GPU designers, AMD and Nvidia, are pursuing this approach with an array of applications. Nvidia and AMD collaborated with Stanford University to create a GPU-based client for the Folding@home distributed computing project for protein folding calculations. In certain circumstances, the GPU calculates forty times faster than the CPUs traditionally used by such applications.

GPU acceleration plays a key role in modern large-scale modeling. TOP500 data shows that the majority of top-performing supercomputers rely on GPU integrated systems.

Since 2005 there has been interest in using the performance offered by GPUs for evolutionary computation in general, and for accelerating the fitness evaluation in genetic programming in particular. Most approaches compile linear or tree programs on the host PC and transfer the executable to the GPU to be run. Typically a performance advantage is only obtained by running the single active program simultaneously on many example problems in parallel, using the GPU's single instruction, multiple data (SIMD) architecture. Substantial acceleration can also be obtained by not compiling the programs, and instead transferring them to the GPU, to be interpreted there.

As of the June 2026 TOP500 list, 276 supercomputers utilize accelerator or co-processor technology, which represents an increase from 255 systems six months earlier. The latest data shows 107 systems equipped with NVIDIA Hopper chips, followed by 62 using NVIDIA Ampere and 32 featuring AMD instinct.

=== External GPU (eGPU) ===
A GPU can be attached to some external bus of a notebook. PCI Express is the only bus used for this purpose. The port may be, for example, an ExpressCard or mPCIe port (PCIe ×1, up to 5 or 2.5 gigabits per second respectively), a Thunderbolt 1, 2, or 3 port (PCIe ×4, up to 10, 20, or 40 gigabits per second respectively), a USB4 port with Thunderbolt compatibility, or an OCuLink port. Those ports are only available on certain notebook systems. eGPU enclosures include their own power supply (PSU), because powerful GPUs can consume hundreds of watts.

== History ==
=== 1960s ===
Adage Graphics terminal from 1968 brochure

Dedicated 3D graphics hardware dates back to graphic terminals such as the Adage AGT-30 from 1967 with analog matrix processors. In 1969 Evans & Sutherland (E&S) introduced the Line Drawing System-1 (LDS-1), which was the first all-digital system to provide matrix multiplication. Also in 1969, the low-cost graphics terminal IMLAC PDS-1 was introduced. It later saw use as an early 3D gaming machine with the likes of Maze War.

=== 1970s ===
In the 1970s, the term "GPU" originally stood for graphics processor unit and described a programmable processing unit working independently from the CPU that was responsible for graphics manipulation and output.

In professional hardware, in 1972 PLATO IV system becomes operational at the University of Illinois Urbana-Champaign. Between around 1973 and 1978, several networked multiplayer wireframe 3D games are implemented and popularized by users of the system. Also in 1972, the E&S Continuous Tone 1 (CT1) "Watkins box" system (consisting of an E&S LDS-2 and Shaded Picture System) is delivered to Case Western Reserve University. It offered the first real-time Gouraud shading. In 1975, a joint effort between Evans & Sutherland Computer Corporation and the University of Utah's computer graphics department results in the first ever MOSFET video framebuffer, capable of color and smooth shading. E&S Continuous Tone 3 (CT3) system was delivered in 1977 to Lufthansa for pilot training using computer simulation. It was the first graphics system capable of real-time texture mapping. Ikonas made graphics systems with 8- and 24-bit graphics and 3D acceleration in the late 70s.

Arcade system boards have used specialized 2D graphics circuits since the 1970s. In early video game hardware, RAM for frame buffers was expensive, so video chips composited data together as the display was being scanned out on the monitor.

A specialized barrel shifter circuit helped the CPU animate the framebuffer graphics for various 1970s arcade video games from Midway and Taito, such as Gun Fight (1975), Sea Wolf (1976), and Space Invaders (1978). The Namco Galaxian arcade system in 1979 used specialized graphics hardware that supported RGB color, multi-colored sprites, and tilemap backgrounds. The Galaxian hardware was widely used during the golden age of arcade video games, by game companies such as Namco, Centuri, Gremlin, Irem, Konami, Midway, Nichibutsu, Sega, and Taito.

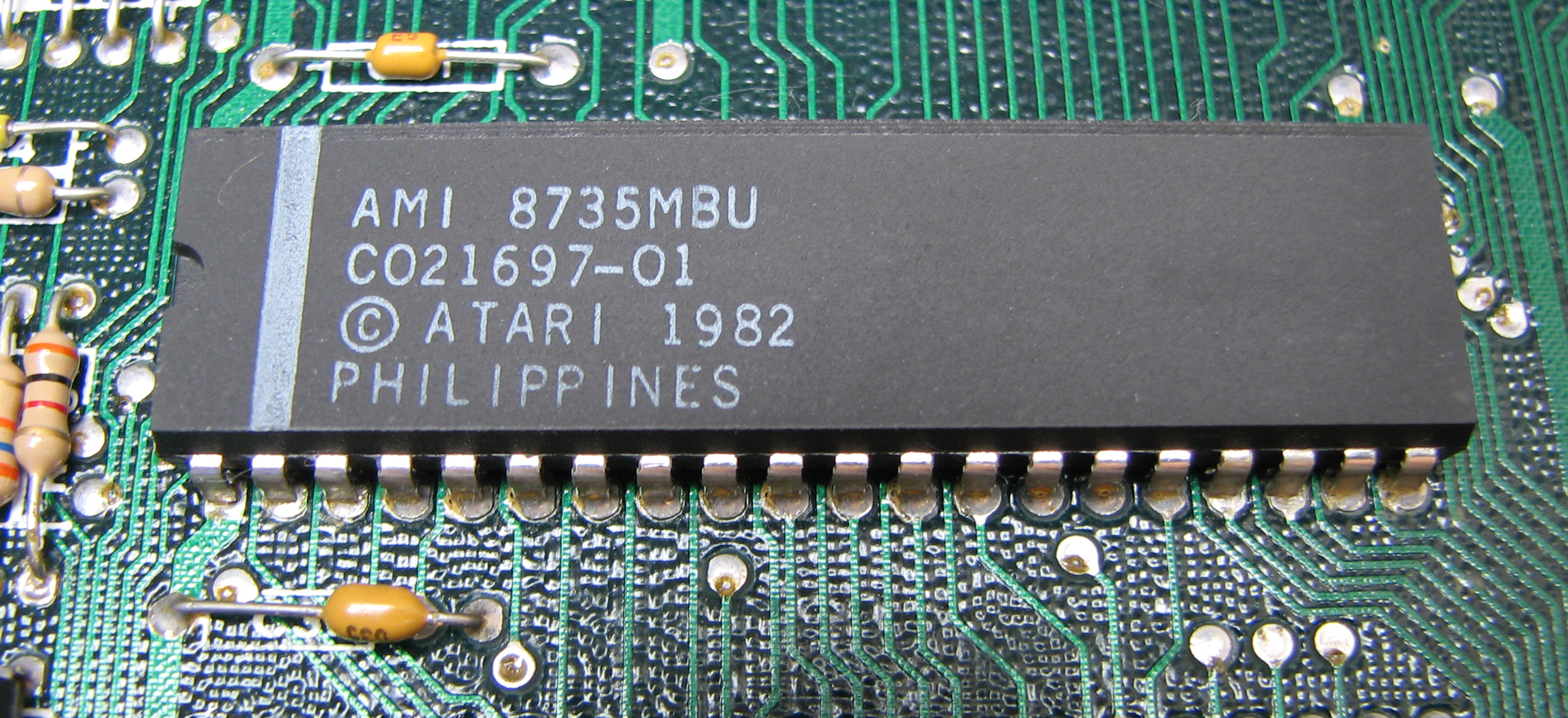
Atari ANTIC microprocessor on an Atari 130XE motherboard

The Atari 2600 in 1977 used a video shifter called the Television Interface Adaptor. Atari 8-bit computers (1979) had ANTIC, a video processor which interpreted instructions describing a "display list"—the way the scan lines map to specific bitmapped or character modes and where the memory is stored (so there did not need to be a contiguous frame buffer). 6502 machine code subroutines could be triggered on scan lines by setting a bit on a display list instruction. ANTIC also supported smooth vertical and horizontal scrolling independent of the CPU.

=== 1980s ===
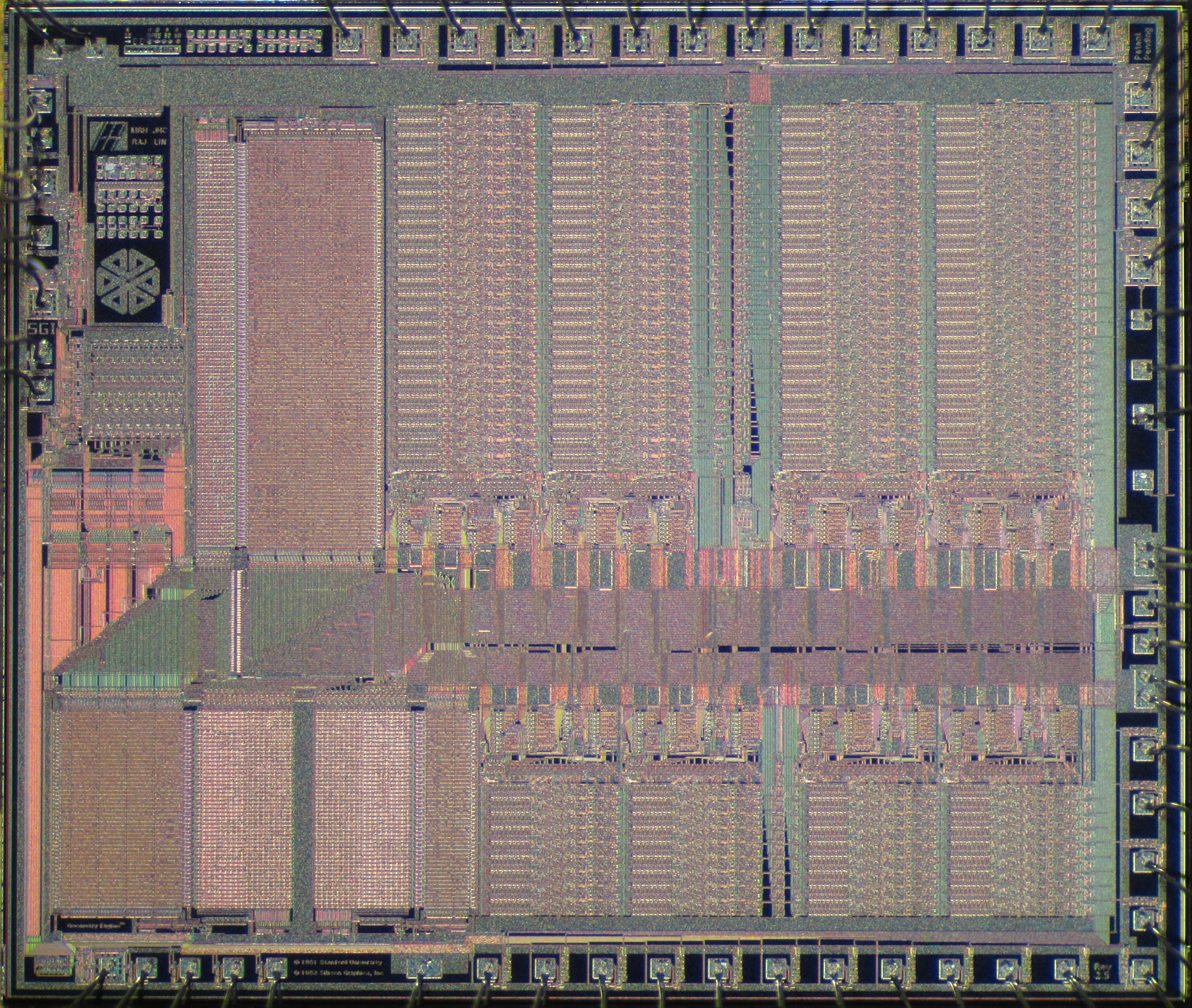
Geometry Engine integrated circuit

In the 1980s significant advancements were made in professional 3D graphics hardware. Perhaps most impactful was the 1981 development of the Geometry Engine, a VLSI vector processor ASIC designed by Jim Clark and Marc Hannah at Stanford University. This processor is the forerunner of modern tensor cores and other similar processors marketed for graphics and AI. The Geometry Engine went on to be used in Silicon Graphics workstations for many years. Silicon Graphics's first product, shipped in November 1983, was the IRIS 1000, a terminal with hardware-accelerated 3D graphics based on the Geometry Engine. The Geometry Engine was capable of approximately 6 million operations per second.

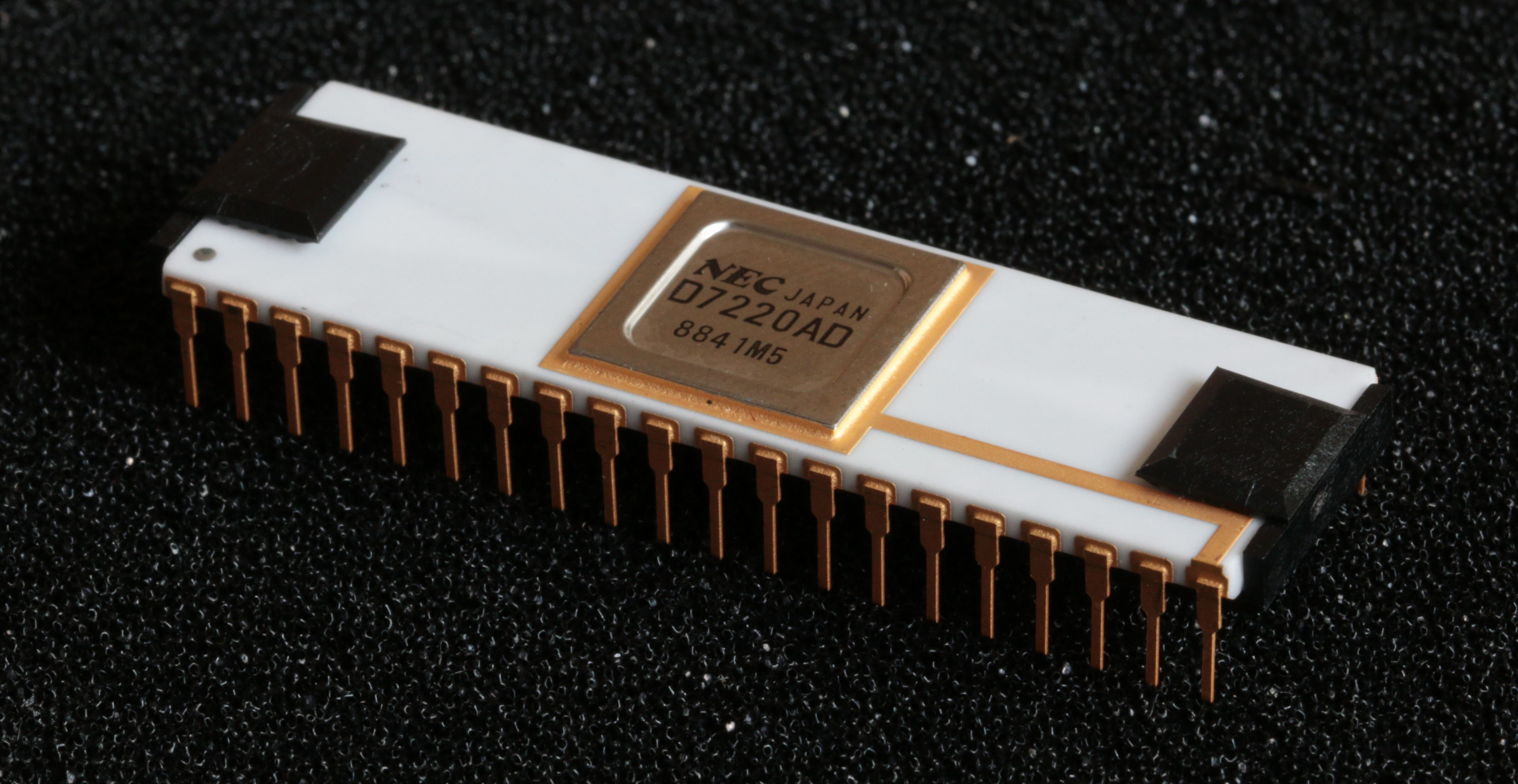
NEC μPD7220A

The 1981 NEC μPD7220 was the first implementation of a personal computer graphics display processor as a single large-scale integration (LSI) integrated circuit chip. This enabled the design of low-cost, high-performance video graphics cards such as those from Number Nine Visual Technology. It became the best-known GPU until the mid-1980s. It was the first fully integrated VLSI (very large-scale integration) metal–oxide–semiconductor (NMOS) graphics display processor for PCs, supported up to 1024×1024 resolution, and laid the foundations for the PC graphics market. It was used in a number of graphics cards and was licensed for clones such as the Intel 82720, the first of Intel's graphics processing units. The Williams Electronics arcade games Robotron: 2084, Joust, Sinistar, and Bubbles, all released in 1982, contain custom blitter chips for operating on 16-color bitmaps.

In 1984, Hitachi released the ACRTC HD63484, the first major CMOS graphics processor for personal computers. The ARTC could display up to 4K resolution when in monochrome mode. It was used in a number of graphics cards and terminals during the late 1980s.

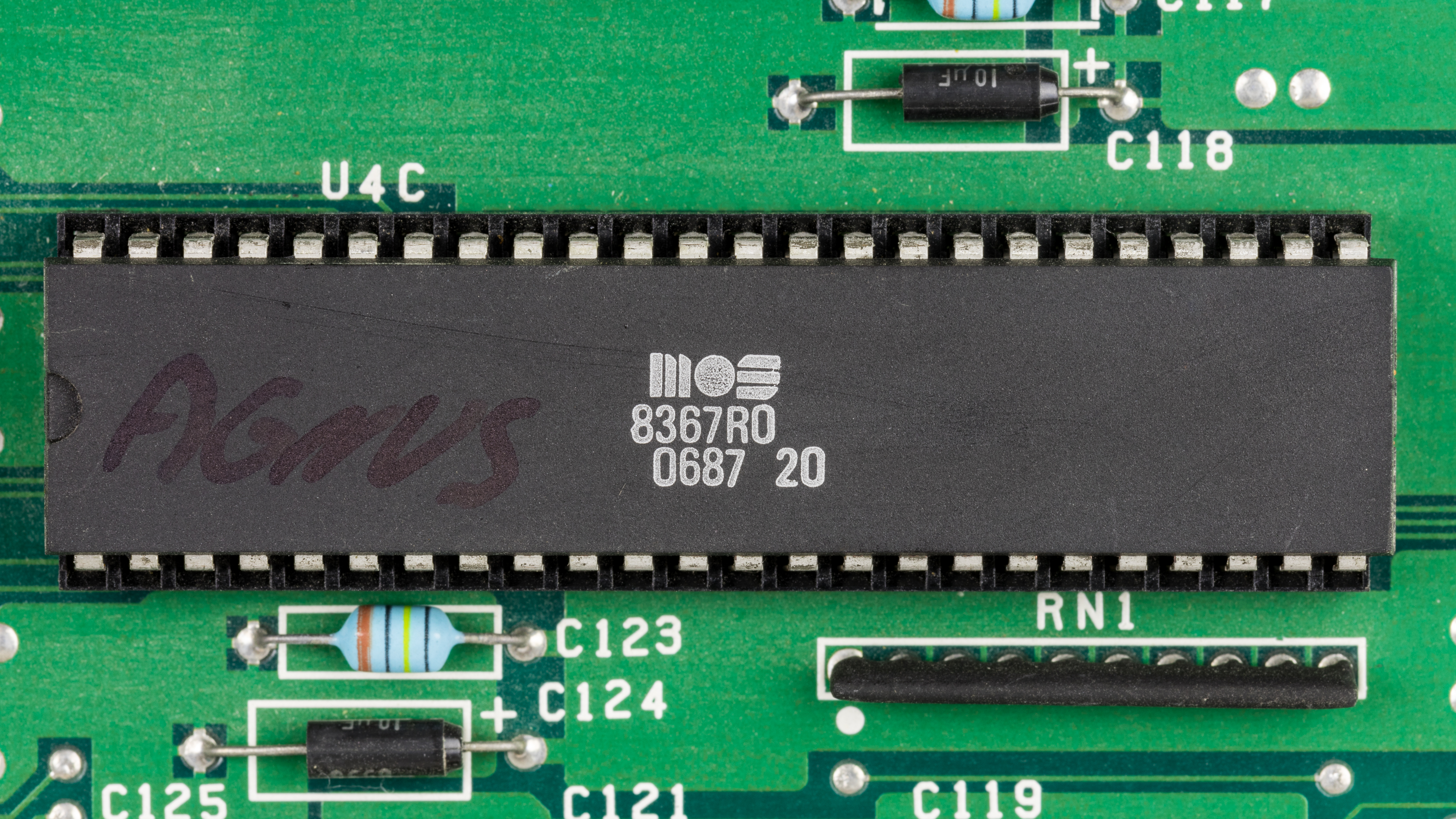
MOS 8367R0 – Agnus

In 1985, the Amiga was released with a custom graphics chip called Agnus including a blitter for bitmap manipulation, line drawing, and area fill. It also included a coprocessor with its own simple instruction set, that was capable of manipulating graphics hardware registers in sync with the video beam (e.g. for per-scanline palette switches, sprite multiplexing, and hardware windowing), or driving the blitter.

Also in 1985, IBM released the Professional Graphics Controller, designed by later to be Nvidia co-founder Curtis Priem, which was a rudimentary 3D card with 640 × 480 256-color graphics which used a dedicated CPU to draw graphics independently of the main system. It was used as the basis of cards by a number of makers (including Matrox) and its analog RGB signaling led directly to the VGA video standard. Priem later in the 80s worked on the influential Sun Microsystems GX (also known as cgsix) accelerated 2D graphics card.

In 1986, Texas Instruments released the TMS34010, the first fully programmable graphics processor. It could run general-purpose code but also had a graphics-oriented instruction set. During 1990–1992, this chip became the basis of the Texas Instruments Graphics Architecture ("TIGA") Windows accelerator cards.

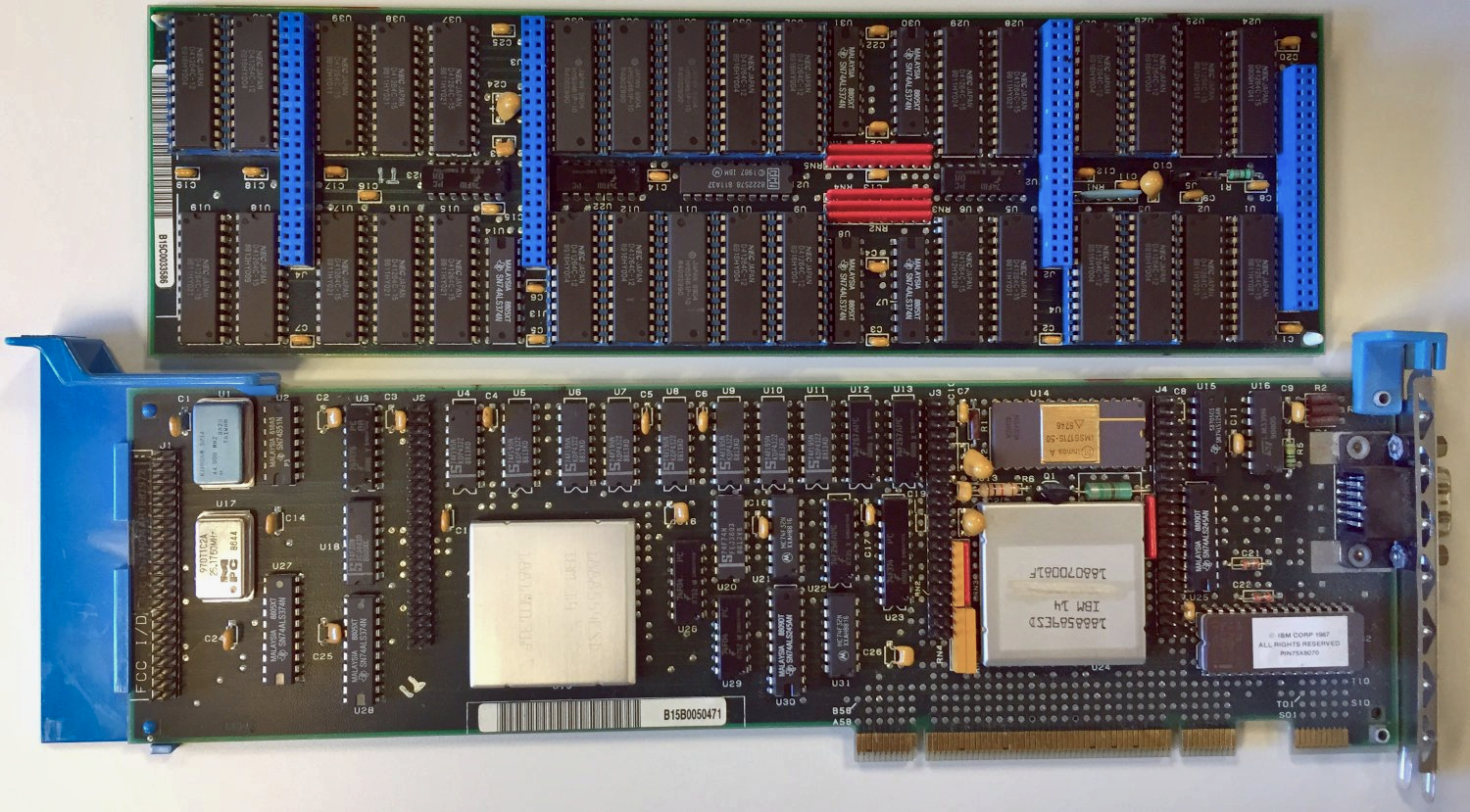
The IBM 8514 Micro Channel adapter, with memory add-on

Following in 1987, the IBM 8514 graphics system was released. It was one of the first video cards for IBM PC compatibles that implemented fixed-function 2D primitives in electronic hardware. Sharp's X68000, released in 1987, used a custom graphics chipset with a 65,536 color palette and hardware support for sprites, scrolling, and multiple playfields. It served as a development machine for Capcom's CP System arcade board. Fujitsu's FM Towns computer, released in 1989, had support for a 16,777,216 color palette.

For context, IBM also introduced its Video Graphics Array (VGA) display system in 1987, with a maximum resolution of 640 × 480 pixels. Unlike 8514/A, VGA had no hardware acceleration features. In November 1988, NEC Home Electronics announced its creation of the Video Electronics Standards Association (VESA) to develop and promote a Super VGA (SVGA) computer display standard as a successor to VGA. Super VGA enabled graphics display resolutions up to 800 × 600 pixels, a 56% increase.

In 1988 SGI sold IRIS workstation graphics with 10-12 Geometry Engines and introduced the IrisVision add-in board for IBM MicroChannel bus (RS/6000) based on the Geometry Engine as well.

In 1988 as well, the first dedicated polygonal 3D graphics boards in arcade machines were introduced with the Namco System 21 and Taito Air System.

=== 1990s ===
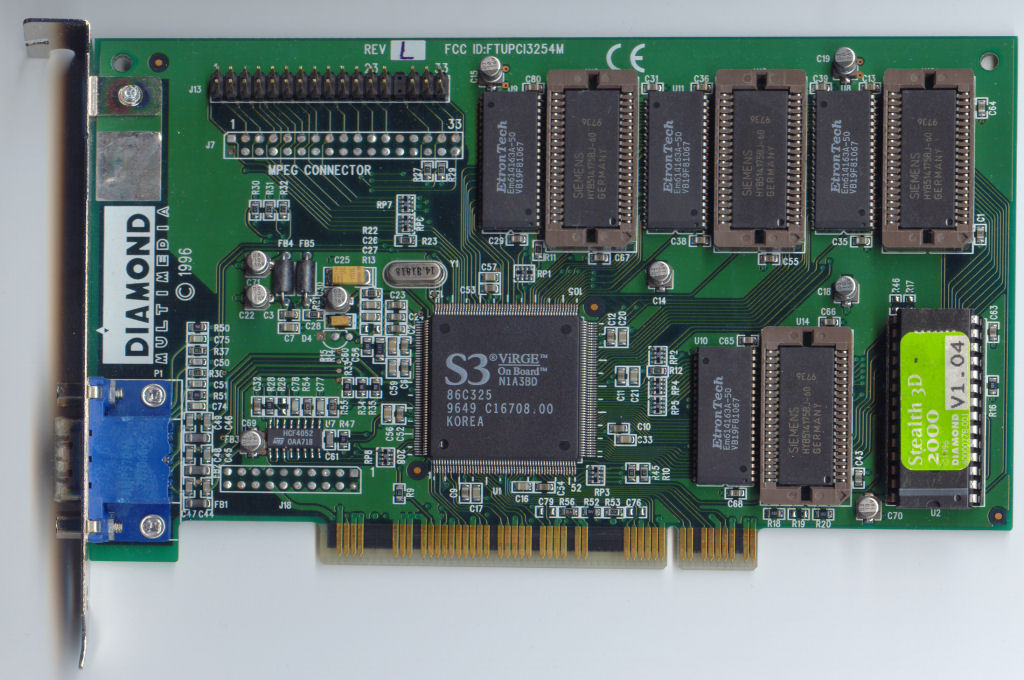
S3 Graphics ViRGE

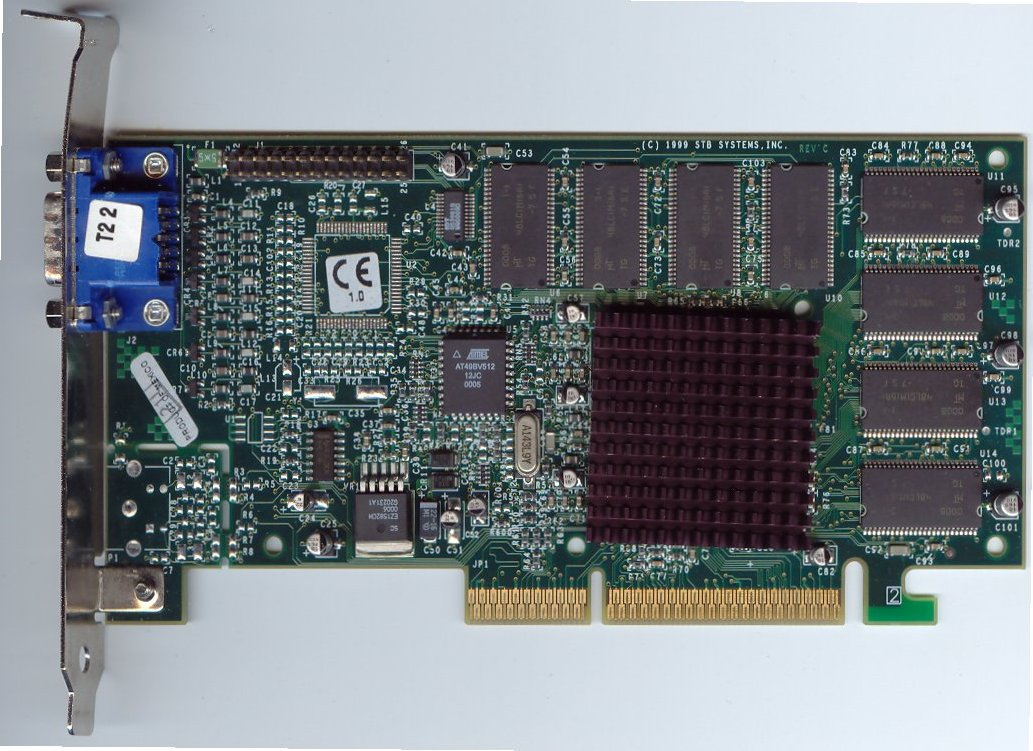
Voodoo3 2000 AGP card

The 1990s again saw considerable advancements in professional workstation 3D graphics hardware from Sun Microsystems, SGI, and others. The introduction of OpenGL by SGI in 1992 paved the way for standard hardware-independent 3D programming interfaces. However, by the mid and late 90s, professional hardware was being slowly eclipsed by consumer products which offered similar or even better performance, especially in regards to texture mapping, at a lower cost and on platforms familiar to end users.

In 1991, S3 Graphics introduced the S3 86C911, which its designers named after the Porsche 911 as an indication of the performance increase it promised. The 86C911 spawned a variety of imitators: by 1995, all major PC graphics chip makers had added 2D acceleration support to their chips. Fixed-function Windows accelerators surpassed expensive general-purpose graphics coprocessors in Windows performance, and such coprocessors faded from the PC market.

In the early- and mid-1990s, real-time 3D graphics became increasingly common in arcade, computer, and console games, which led to increasing public demand for hardware-accelerated 3D graphics. Early examples of mass-market 3D graphics hardware can be found in arcade system boards such as the Sega Model 1, Namco System 22, and Sega Model 2, and the fifth-generation video game consoles such as the Saturn, PlayStation, and Nintendo 64. Arcade systems such as the Sega Model 2 and SGI Onyx-based Namco Magic Edge Hornet Simulator in 1993 were capable of hardware T&L (transform, clipping, and lighting) years before appearing in consumer graphics cards.

In 1994, Sony used the term GPU (with the meaning graphics processing unit) in reference to the PlayStation console's Toshiba-designed Sony GPU. The term "GPU" was coined by Sony in reference to the 32-bit Sony GPU (designed by Toshiba) in the PlayStation video game console, released in 1994. Another early example is the Super FX chip, a RISC-based on-cartridge graphics chip used in some SNES games, notably Star Fox (1993) and Doom (1995). Some systems used DSPs to accelerate transformations.

Fujitsu, which worked on the Sega Model 2 arcade system, began working on integrating T&L into a single LSI solution for use in home computers in 1995; the Fujitsu Pinolite, the first 3D geometry processor for personal computers, announced in 1997. The first hardware T&L GPU on home video game consoles was the Nintendo 64's Reality Coprocessor, released in 1996. In 1997, Mitsubishi released the 3Dpro/2MP, a GPU capable of transformation and lighting, for workstations and Windows NT desktops; ATi used it for its FireGL 4000 graphics card, released in 1997.

The term "GPU" was popularized by Nvidia in 1999, who marketed the GeForce 256 as "the world's first GPU". It was presented as a "single-chip processor with integrated transform, lighting, triangle setup/clipping, and rendering engines".

=== 2000s ===
In October 2002, with the introduction of the ATI Radeon 9700 (also known as R300), the world's first Direct3D 9.0 accelerator, pixel and vertex shaders could implement looping and lengthy floating point math, and were quickly becoming as flexible as CPUs, yet orders of magnitude faster for image-array operations. Pixel shading is often used for bump mapping, which adds texture to make an object look shiny, dull, rough, or even round or extruded.

With the introduction of the Nvidia GeForce 8 series and new generic stream processing units, GPUs became more generalized computing devices. Parallel GPUs are making computational inroads against the CPU, and a subfield of research, dubbed GPU computing or GPGPU for general purpose computing on GPU, has found applications in fields as diverse as machine learning, oil exploration, scientific image processing, linear algebra, statistics, 3D reconstruction, and stock options pricing. GPGPUs were the precursors to what is now called a compute shader (e.g. CUDA, OpenCL, DirectCompute) and actually abused the hardware to a degree by treating the data passed to algorithms as texture maps and executing algorithms by drawing a triangle or quad with an appropriate pixel shader. This entails some overheads since units like the scan converter are involved where they are not needed (nor are triangle manipulations even a concern—except to invoke the pixel shader).

Nvidia's CUDA platform, first introduced in 2007, was the earliest widely adopted programming model for GPU computing. OpenCL is an open standard defined by the Khronos Group that allows for the development of code for both GPUs and CPUs with an emphasis on portability. OpenCL solutions are supported by Intel, AMD, Nvidia, and ARM, and according to a report in 2011 by Evans Data, OpenCL had become the second most popular HPC tool.

=== 2010s ===
In 2010, Nvidia partnered with Audi to power their cars' dashboards, using the Tegra GPU to provide increased functionality to cars' navigation and entertainment systems. Advances in GPU technology in cars helped advance self-driving technology. AMD's Radeon HD 6000 series cards were released in 2010, and in 2011 AMD released its 6000M Series discrete GPUs for mobile devices. The Kepler line of graphics cards by Nvidia were released in 2012 and were used in the Nvidia 600 and 700 series cards. A feature in this GPU microarchitecture included GPU boost, a technology that adjusts the clock-speed of a video card to increase or decrease according to its power draw. Kepler also introduced NVENC video encoding acceleration technology.

The PS4 and Xbox One were released in 2013; they both used GPUs based on AMD's Radeon HD 7850 and 7790. Nvidia's Kepler line of GPUs was followed by the Maxwell line, manufactured on the same process. Nvidia's 28 nm chips were manufactured by TSMC in Taiwan using the 28 nm process. Compared to the 40 nm technology from the past, this manufacturing process allowed a 20 percent boost in performance while drawing less power. Virtual reality headsets have high system requirements; manufacturers recommended the GTX 970 and the R9 290X or better at the time of their release. Cards based on the Pascal microarchitecture were released in 2016. The GeForce 10 series of cards are of this generation of graphics cards. They are made using the 16 nm manufacturing process which improves upon previous microarchitectures.

In 2018, Nvidia launched the RTX 20 series GPUs that added ray tracing cores to GPUs, allowing real time ray tracing to be performant on mass market hardware. Polaris 11 and Polaris 10 GPUs from AMD are fabricated by a 14 nm process. Their release resulted in a substantial increase in the performance per watt of AMD video cards. AMD also released the Vega GPU series for the high end market as a competitor to Nvidia's high end Pascal cards, also featuring HBM2 like the Titan V.

In 2019, AMD released the successor to their Graphics Core Next (GCN) microarchitecture/instruction set. Dubbed RDNA, the first product featuring it was the Radeon RX 5000 series of video cards. The company announced that the successor to the RDNA microarchitecture would be incremental (a "refresh"). AMD unveiled the Radeon RX 6000 series, its RDNA 2 graphics cards with support for hardware-accelerated ray tracing. The product series, launched in late 2020, consisted of the RX 6800, RX 6800 XT, and RX 6900 XT. The RX 6700 XT, which is based on Navi 22, was launched in early 2021.

The PlayStation 5 and Xbox Series X and Series S were released in 2020; they both use GPUs based on the RDNA 2 microarchitecture with incremental improvements and different GPU configurations in each system's implementation.

=== 2020s ===
In the 2020s, GPUs have been increasingly used for calculations involving embarrassingly parallel problems, such as training of neural networks on enormous datasets that are needed for artificial intelligence. Specialized processing cores on most modern GPUs that are dedicated to deep learning provide significant FLOPS performance increases, using 4×4 matrix multiplication and division. Early implementations, such as Nvidia's Volta microarchitecture, released in 2017, saw results of up to 128 TFLOPS in some applications.

Since then, AI acceleration cores have been a widely adopted feature in consumer and workstation microarchitectures starting with Nvidia's Turing microarchitecture in 2018, named Tensor cores. Originally used for Deep Learning Super Sampling (DLSS) to enhance gaming performance and improve image quality, they have since been used in Nvidia's Broadcast software to provide many AI powered effects such as voice filtering and video noise removal and in other software such as Blender for DLSS in the view port.

AMD originally implemented their equivalent "Matrix" Cores for consumers in their RDNA 3 architecture – however RDNA 4's Matrix Cores were the first to introduce FP8 acceleration – which is required to run the full FSR Redstone feature set such as Machine Learning Upscaling and Frame Generation. However, community made hacks on both Linux and Windows have allowed RDNA 2, 3, and competitor GPUs to run a weaker version of FSR 4 known as FSR 4 INT8. The PlayStation 5 Pro, launched in 2024, has customized Machine Learning cores – which focus solely on INT8 acceleration – based on RDNA 4's for PlayStation Spectral Super Resolution to enhance framerates and image quality.

Intel has implemented their equivalent "XMX" Cores in all of their Arc GPUs, starting with the Alchemist microarchitecture. This is used for XeSS (Xe Super Sampling), XeFG (Xe Frame Generation), and more.

Ray tracing has also been incredibly prevalent in the 2020s with some games, such as DOOM: The Dark Ages, requiring a hardware ray tracing capable GPU to even start. While it does lead to worse performance and less overall accessibility, id software claimed this saved several man hours and shrinked the game by over 100 gigabytes due to the game being entirely built around ray tracing.

== Sales ==
In 2013, 438.3 million GPUs were shipped globally and the forecast for 2014 was 414.2 million. However, by the third quarter of 2022, shipments of PC GPUs totaled around 75.5 million units, down 19% year-over-year.

== See also ==
- UALink
- Texture mapping unit (TMU)
- Render output unit (ROP)
- Brute force attack
- Computer hardware
- Computer monitor
- GPU cache
- GPU virtualization
- Manycore processor
- Physics processing unit (PPU)
- Tensor Processing Unit (TPU)
- Ray-tracing hardware
- Single instruction, multiple threads (SIMT)
- Software rendering
- Vision processing unit (VPU)
- Vector processor
- Video card
- Video display controller
- Video game console
- AI accelerator
- GPU Vector Processor internal features

=== Hardware ===
- List of AMD graphics processing units
- List of Nvidia graphics processing units
- List of Intel graphics processing units
- List of discrete and integrated graphics processing units
- Intel GMA
- Intel Graphics Technology
  - Intel Arc
  - Intel Quick Sync Video
- Larrabee
- Nvidia PureVideo – the bit-stream technology from Nvidia used in their graphics chips to accelerate video decoding on hardware GPU with DXVA.
  - NVDEC
  - NVENC
- SoC
- UVD (Unified Video Decoder) – the video decoding bit-stream technology from ATI to support hardware (GPU) decode with DXVA

=== APIs ===
- OpenGL API
  - OpenGL ES
- OpenCL API
- OpenVX API
- TensorFlow Lite
- Mantle (API)
- Metal (API)
  - Core ML
  - MediaToolbox
- Vulkan (API)
- Direct3D
  - DirectX Video Acceleration (DxVA) API for Microsoft Windows operating-system.
  - DirectML
- Direct2D
  - DirectDraw
  - DirectWrite
- Video Acceleration API (VA API)
- VDPAU (Video Decode and Presentation API for Unix)
- MediaCodec for Android
- X-Video Bitstream Acceleration (XvBA), the X11 equivalent of DXVA for MPEG-2, H.264, and VC-1
- X-Video Motion Compensation – the X11 equivalent for MPEG-2 video codec only

=== Applications ===
- GPU cluster
- Mathematica – includes built-in support for CUDA and OpenCL GPU execution
- Molecular modeling on GPUs
- Deeplearning4j – open-source, distributed deep learning for Java

=== People ===
- List of eponyms of Nvidia GPU microarchitectures

== Sources ==
- Peddie, Jon (1 January 2023). The History of the GPU – New Developments. Springer Nature. ISBN 978-3-03-114047-1. OCLC 1356877844.
