= ColorCAM =

Computer software

ColorCAM was both a CAD and a computer-aided manufacturing (CAM) system for printed circuit boards (PCB). Introduced in 1983 by Lothar Klein, LKSoft, it was one of the first systems running on a personal computer instead of a workstation or mainframe, which was typically the case for all CAD applications at that time.

ColorCAM was originally developed and marketed under the name LAYCAD and was running on computers from ELTEC in Mainz, Germany, and HEMA in Aalen, Germany, using the Motorola 6809 CPU, one of the most powerful 8/16-bit processors at that time. To be able to address more than the maximal 64 kilobytes of RAM available with a 16-bit address space, these computers had special hardware to superimpose a memory window in this 16-bit address space, from a bigger storage with up to 512 Kbyte RAM. The ELTEC computer had a 512×256 pixel memory mapped graphic while the HEMA computer had a 640×400 pixel graphic using the NEC 7220 graphics controller chip. Both computers used the FLEX (operating system).

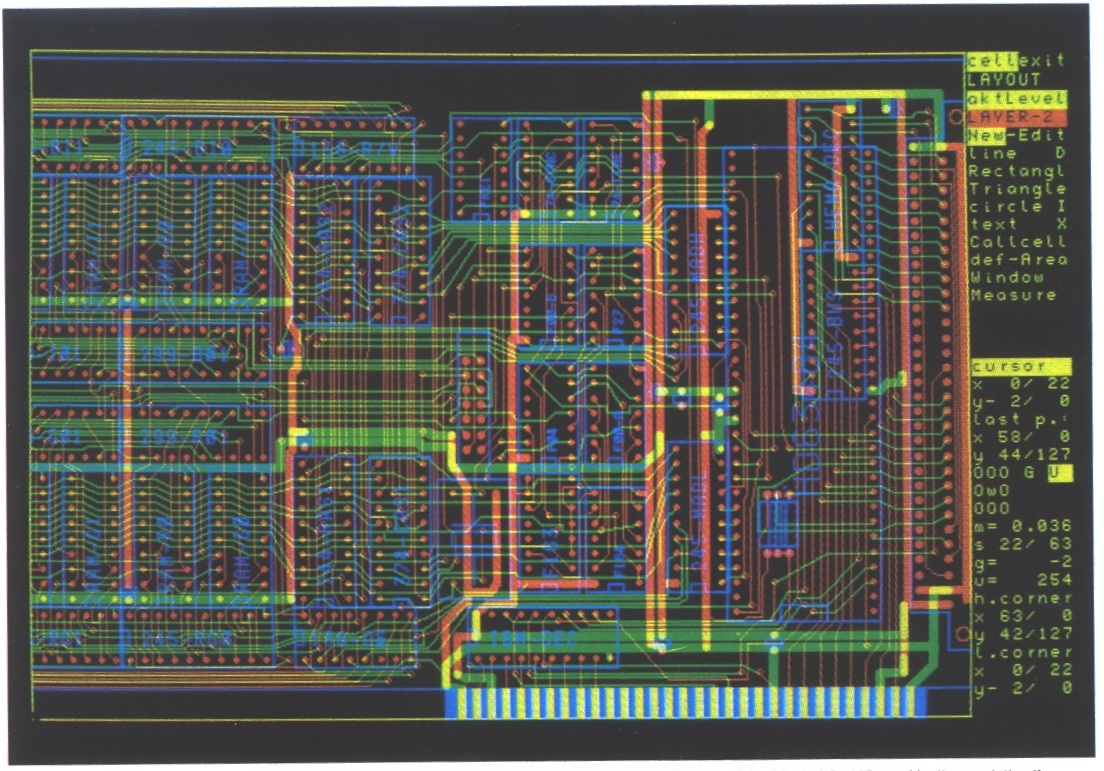
Picture of ColorCAM on monitor, 640*400 with 4 bit/pixel, showing PCB layout of a graphics card

In 1984, ColorCAM was ported onto the newly introduced 16-bit IBM AT computer. At that time the only available colour graphics adapter (CGA) had a resolution of 320×200 pixels, not sufficient for a CAD application. So the HEMA graphics was turned into an external "graphic box" and connected with the IBM AT via the parallel port. A next major improvement was the introduction of an expansion board using the Hitachi ACRTC HD63484 graphics controller. With up to 1 megabyte of video RAM, it was possible to create a 1600×1200-pixel graphic with four bits/pixel and display it on a 1024×786 cathode ray tube (CRT) display. The processing power of the IBM-AT class of computers was too low to implement algorithms for the automatic routing of tracks on the PCB. Therefore, a solution using Maze runner concepts was realized on an expansion board using the INMOS Transputer to boost the processing power. ColorCAM itself was written in the Pascal programming language with only small parts in assembly language.

On the CAM side, ColorCAM was optimized for running the milling and drilling machines from LPKF Laser & Electronics AG for the production of PCB prototypes.

Support and sales of ColorCAM were discontinued in 1993. In total, more than 1000 licenses of ColorCAM were sold worldwide by LPKF Laser & Electronics AG within less than 10 years.
