= List of discrete and integrated graphics processing units =

Graphics Processing Units (GPUs) are specialized electronic circuits designed to accelerate the processing of images, videos, and complex graphics tasks. They are essential components in various computing devices, ranging from personal computers to data centers. GPUs are broadly categorized into two types: Discrete GPUs and Integrated GPUs.

== Discrete GPUs ==
Discrete GPUs are standalone graphics cards with their own dedicated memory, typically installed in a PCIe slot on a motherboard. They are primarily used in high-performance scenarios such as gaming, professional graphics work, and scientific computing. Discrete GPUs are known for their superior performance compared to integrated GPUs, as they do not share resources with the CPU.

Discrete GPU Series
Manufacturer	Series/Family
NVIDIA	GeForce GT, GeForce GTS, GeForce GTX, GeForce RTX, GeForce MX, Quadro, TITAN, Tesla, A100, H100, V100, Jetson, RIVA, TNT, GRID, NVS
AMD	Radeon RX, Radeon Pro, Radeon Pro W, Vega 10, Vega 20, Vega 56, Vega 64, Radeon VII, W6000, Instinct, FirePro, Fury, Polaris, Navi, M100, Rage
Intel	Arc, Xe Max, Xe HPC, Data Center GPU Max
Others	Matrox, S3, Voodoo, Volari

== Integrated GPUs ==
Integrated GPUs are built into the same chip as the CPU and share the system's memory. They are designed for more energy-efficient and cost-effective computing, making them suitable for everyday tasks such as web browsing, video playback, and light gaming. Integrated GPUs are commonly found in laptops, budget desktops, and mobile devices.

Integrated GPU Series
Manufacturer	Series/Family
Intel	UHD Graphics, HD Graphics, Iris, Iris Pro, Iris Plus, Xe, GMA, GMA X, SGX
AMD	Llano, Trinity, Richland, Kaveri, Godavari, Carrizo, Bristol Ridge, Raven Ridge, Picasso, Renoir, Cézanne, Van Gogh, Lucienne, Rembrandt, Mendocino, Phoenix, Vega 3, Vega 8, Vega 11, Ryzen, Stoney Ridge, Excavator, Kabini, Beema, Temash, APU, Hybrid, FP, Mullins
Others	Alder Lake-P (Intel), Mali (ARM), Adreno (Qualcomm), PowerVR (Imagination Technologies)
