= Texas Instruments Graphics Architecture =

Computer graphics card and interface standard

- Release date: 1989; 37 years ago
- Architecture: TMS34010, TMS34020

Cards
- Entry-level: TIGA-340 (TMS34010 Graphics System Processors based)
- Mid-range: Number Nine Visual Technology Peeper and GX series, Hercules Graphics Station and Chrome, Texas Instruments TIGA Diamond and TIGA Star

History
- Predecessor: VGA
- Successor: VESA, Super VGA

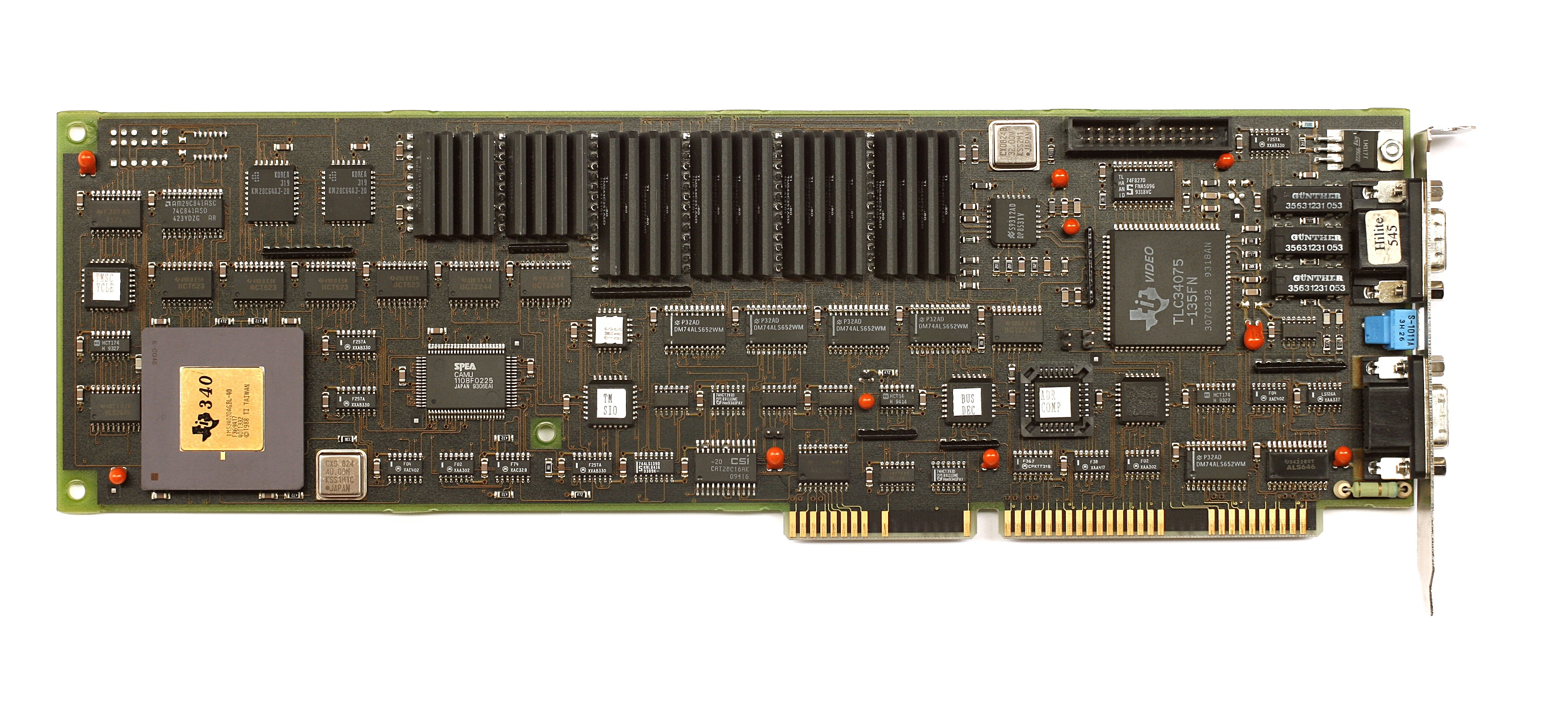
TIGA Add On card with TI TMS34020

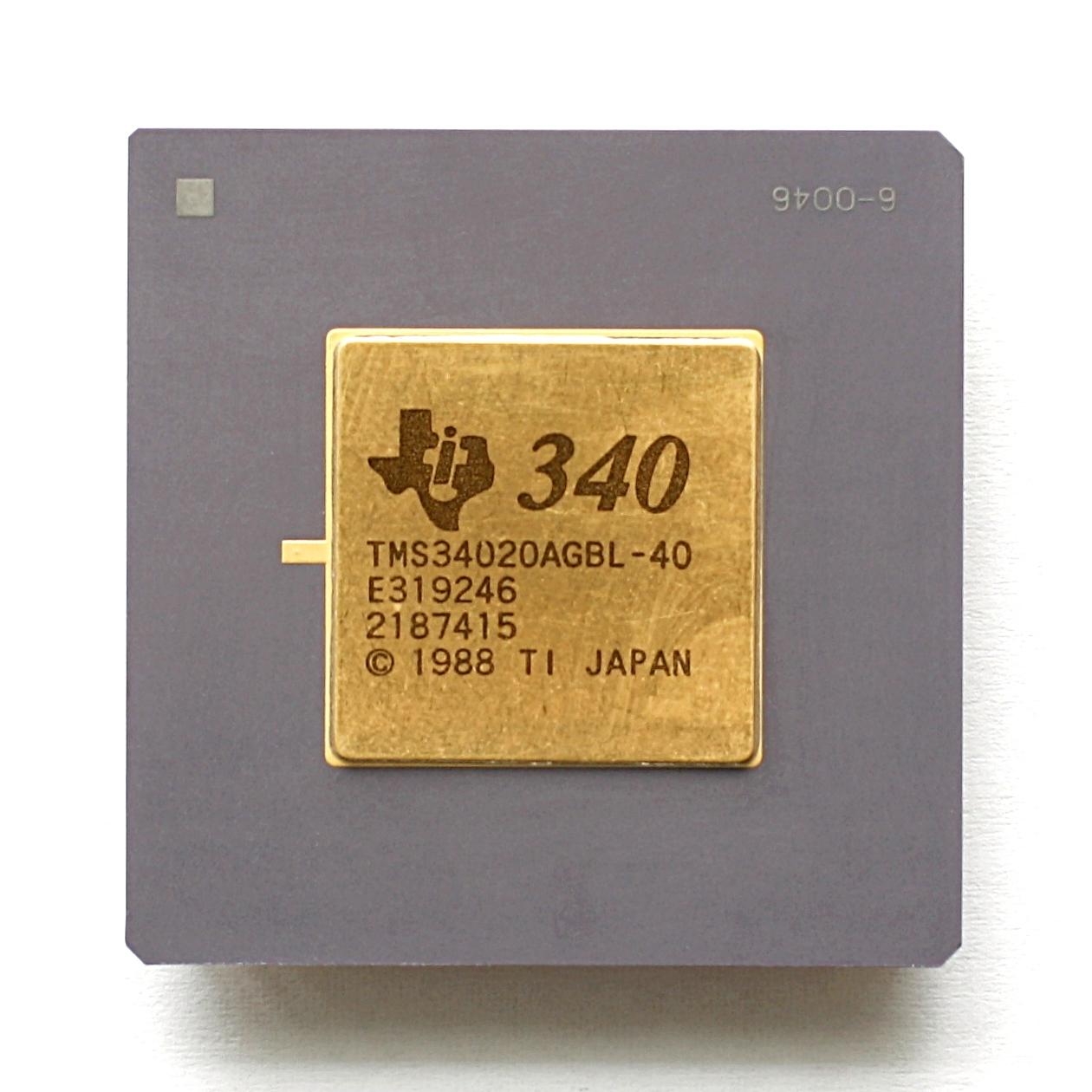
GSP Texas Instruments TMS34020

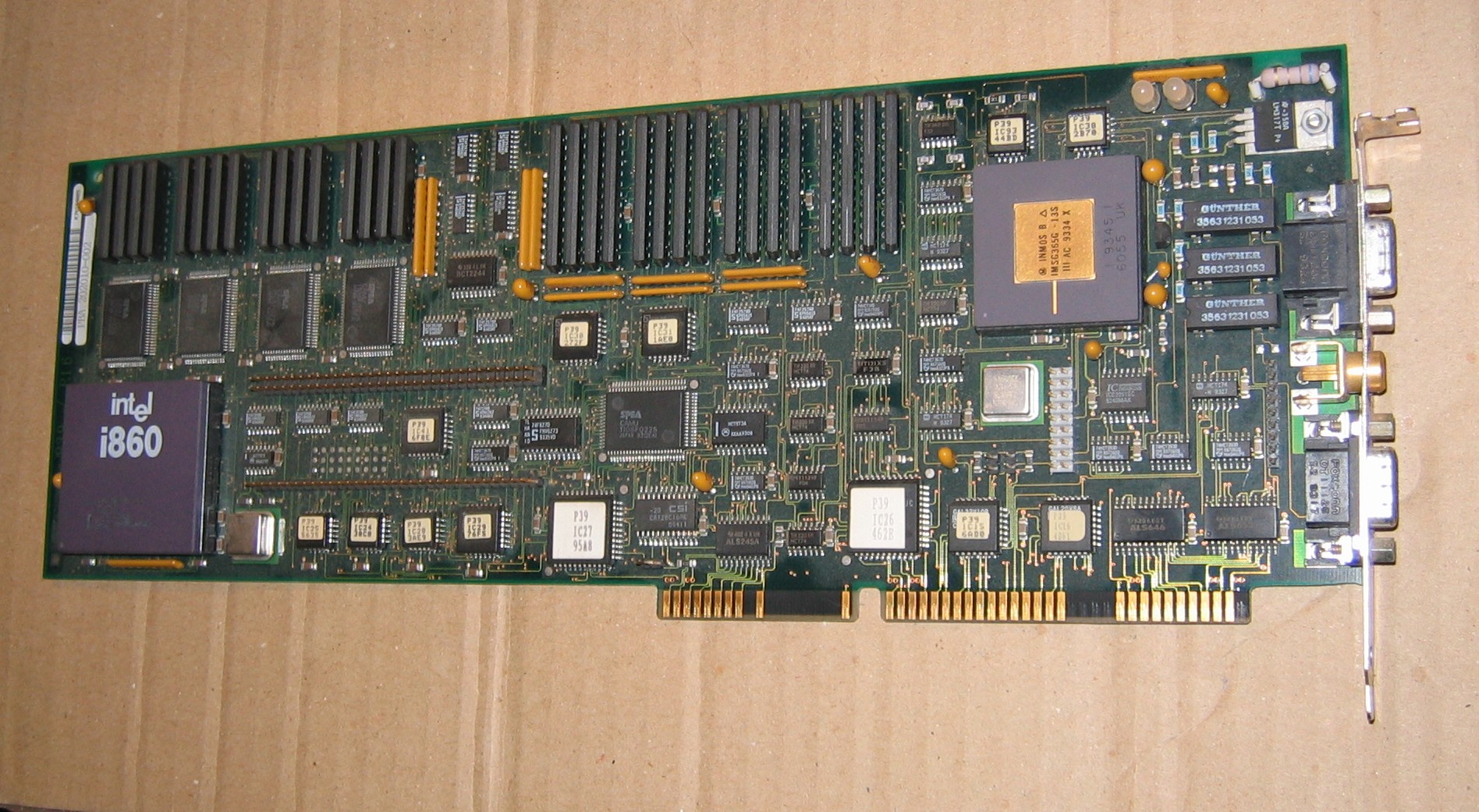
TIGA Add On card with Intel i860

Texas Instruments Graphics Architecture (TIGA) is a graphics interface standard created by Texas Instruments that defined the software interface to graphics processors. Using this standard, any software written for TIGA should work correctly on a TIGA-compliant graphics interface card. Texas Instrument's TMS34010 and TMS34020 Graphics System Processors (GSP) were the original TIGA-compliant graphics processors.

The TIGA standard is independent of resolution and color depth which provides a certain degree of future proofing. This standard was designed for high-end graphics. However, TIGA was not widely adopted. Instead, VESA and Super VGA became the de facto standard for PC graphics devices after the VGA.

== Clone hardware ==
The primary manufacturers of mainstream TIGA cards for the PC clone market included Number Nine Visual Technology and Hercules. Number Nine Visual Technology graphics cards using Texas Instruments' TIGA co-processors were made from about 1986 to 1992, including the Pepper and GX series. Hercules manufactured cards such as the Graphics Station and Chrome lines which were marketed primarily toward users of Microsoft Windows.

Desktop Computing AGA 1024 card was capable of emulating TIGA standards, as well as the IBM 8514.

In the early 1990s, Texas Instruments France (which had marketing control for TIGA architecture and GSP chipsets in Europe) experimented with manufacturing and selling its own range of consumer oriented video cards based on TIGA and aimed at speeding up the user experience of Windows. These products were named TIGA Diamond (34020 based) and TIGA Star (34010 based), and provided a platform for selling TI DRAM and video palette chips as well as the GSP chips themselves.

== Impact ==
Despite the superiority of the technology in comparison to typical Super VGA cards of the era, the relatively high cost and emerging local bus graphics standards meant that IT distributors and PC manufacturers could not see a niche for these products at consumer level.

The (limited) success of the graphics cards paved the way for products based upon various derivatives and clones of IBM's 8514/A architecture.

== See also ==
- TMS34010
- Number Nine Visual Technology TIGA cards
- VESA
- Super VGA
- IBM 8514
