= Number Nine Visual Technology =

Computer company

- Industry: Computer hardware
- Founded: 1982
- Founder: Andrew Najda and Stan Bialek
- Products: Graphics cards
- Website: nine.com at the Wayback Machine (archived 1999-01-17)

Number Nine Visual Technology Corporation was a manufacturer of video graphics chips and cards from 1982 to 1999. Number Nine developed the first 128-bit graphics processor (the Imagine 128), as well as the first 256-color (8-bit) and 16.8 million color (24-bit) cards.

The name of the company, as well as many of its products (e.g., Revolution, Imagine, Pepper, Ticket to Ride) refer to Beatles songs. At system boot up, Number Nine cards' video BIOS splash screens display short phrases from Beatles songs related to the cards' model names. Card model names were usually preceded by a "#9" moniker.

== History ==
Number Nine was founded in 1982 by Andrew Najda and Stan Bialek as Number Nine Computer Corporation. The company was renamed Number Nine Visual Technology Corporation in the early 1990s. For most of its existence, Number Nine was based in Lexington, Massachusetts.

Number Nine initially made an Apple II accelerator board, then later moved into the design and manufacture of high-end PC graphics cards in 1983. Number Nine was one of the premier, higher-end graphics card companies into the early 1990s. In the mid to late 1990s, Number Nine began to lose market share to competitors in both the price and performance arenas. Number Nine was slow to respond to the boom in 3D graphics, continuing to emphasize high quality, fast 2D graphics.

On December 20, 1999, Number Nine announced a "letter-of-intent" for S3 Inc. (later S3 Graphics Co.) to buy substantially all assets and intellectual property of Number Nine. By mid 2000, S3 had completed the acquisition of Number Nine's assets and Number Nine had ceased operations. In 2002 two former Number Nine engineers, James Macleod and Francis Bruno, formed Silicon Spectrum, Inc., and licensed Number Nine's graphics technology from S3 to implement in FPGA devices.

For five years after Number Nine closed its doors, a former employee kept Number Nine's website up and running, with driver downloads and a forum available for self-help. A volunteer and #9 enthusiast provided regular, impromptu technical support on the forum for the last two and a half years the site was active. Several former employees checked in to help occasionally. The website went off the air in March 2005 and the domain name was taken over by an online gambling company.

In 2013, Francis Bruno from Silicon Spectrum tried to fund an open-source GPU based on a #9 Ticket To Ride IV derived design. Started on the crowdfunding platform kickstarter.com, the campaign was unsuccessful as only $13,000 of the requested $200,000 was gathered. Despite this, source code was released under a GPL3 license in August 2014.

== Products ==
The first Number Nine graphics cards were ISA bus, pre-VGA standard cards that had no graphics accelerator chips. In the latter 1980s to early 1990s, Number Nine made ISA and MCA bus graphics cards based on Texas Instruments' TIGA coprocessors.

Beginning in the 1990s, Number Nine made AGP and PCI graphics cards with their own proprietary graphics accelerators (the Imagine line GPUs). Contemporaneously, Number Nine made AGP, PCI, VLB and ISA graphics cards using S3 Graphics' accelerator chips. Their very last AGP card used an Nvidia GPU.

=== Early pre-VGA video cards ===
Early cards (no co-processor, pre-1986, pre-VGA standard):

| #9 Model | Display Resolution | Color Palette | PC Bus | Notes |
|---|---|---|---|---|
| Number Nine Graphics System | CGA | CGA | ISA | |
| Revolution 512x8 | 512×480 | 256 colors selectable from a palette of 16.7 million | ISA | uses NEC μPD7220 |
| Revolution 512x32 | 512×480 | 24bit | ISA | uses NEC μPD7220 |
| Revolution 1024x8 | 1024×768 from 1024×1024 | 256 colors selectable from a palette of 16.7 million | ISA | |
| Revolution 2048x4 | 1280×960 from 2048×1024 | 16 colors selectable from a palette of 4096 | ISA | Hitachi HD63484 Advanced CRT Controller |

The Revolution series were large, full-length cards that ranged in price from $1,995 to $3,995 at introduction.

=== TIGA cards ===
Number Nine graphics cards using Texas Instruments' TIGA co-processors were made from about 1986 to 1992. The Texas Instruments TMS-340x0 co-processors were coupled with custom Number Nine-designed application specific chips, which could only handle very primitive graphics functions such as clipping. Nevertheless, this was a major accomplishment. With the exception of the GXi Lite, all of the TIGA graphics cards were large, full length cards.

Cards using a TIGA co-processor were (in approximate order of introduction):

| #9 Model | TIGA co-processor | Memory | PC Bus Architecture |
|---|---|---|---|
| Pepper | TMS-34010 | ?? | ISA |
| Pepper SGT | TMS-34010 + Intel 82786 | 1 MB, 4 MB? | ISA |
| Pepper Pro 1024 | TMS-34010 | 1.5M, 2M | MCA, ISA |
| Pepper Pro 1280 | TMS-34010 | ?? | MCA?, ISA |
| Pepper Pro 1600 | TMS-34010 | ?? | MCA?, ISA |
| GX | TMS-34010? | ?? 1 MB DRAM? + 2 MB VRAM? | MCA?, ISA |
| GXi Lite | TMS-34020 | 1 MB DRAM + 1 MB VRAM | MCA?, ISA |
| GXi | TMS-34020 | 1 MB DRAM + 2 MB VRAM | MCA?, ISA |
| GXiTC | TMS-34020 | 1 MB? DRAM + 4 MB VRAM | MCA?, ISA |

The TIGA-based cards were very expensive in their day, ranging in price from $995 to $2495 at introduction.

=== Number Nine Video Cards using Number Nine GPUs ===
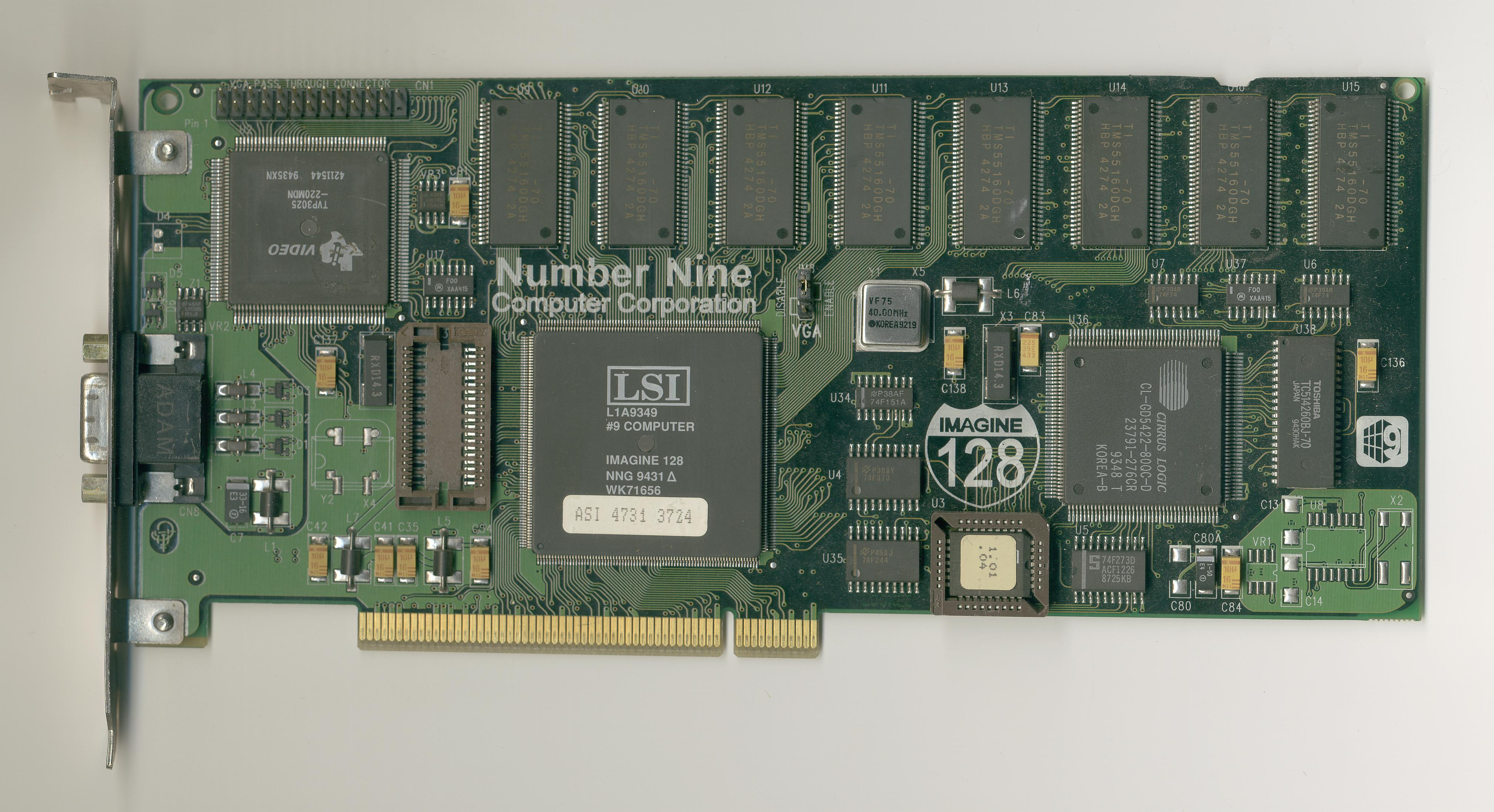
Imagine 128 (early original version, note old company name)

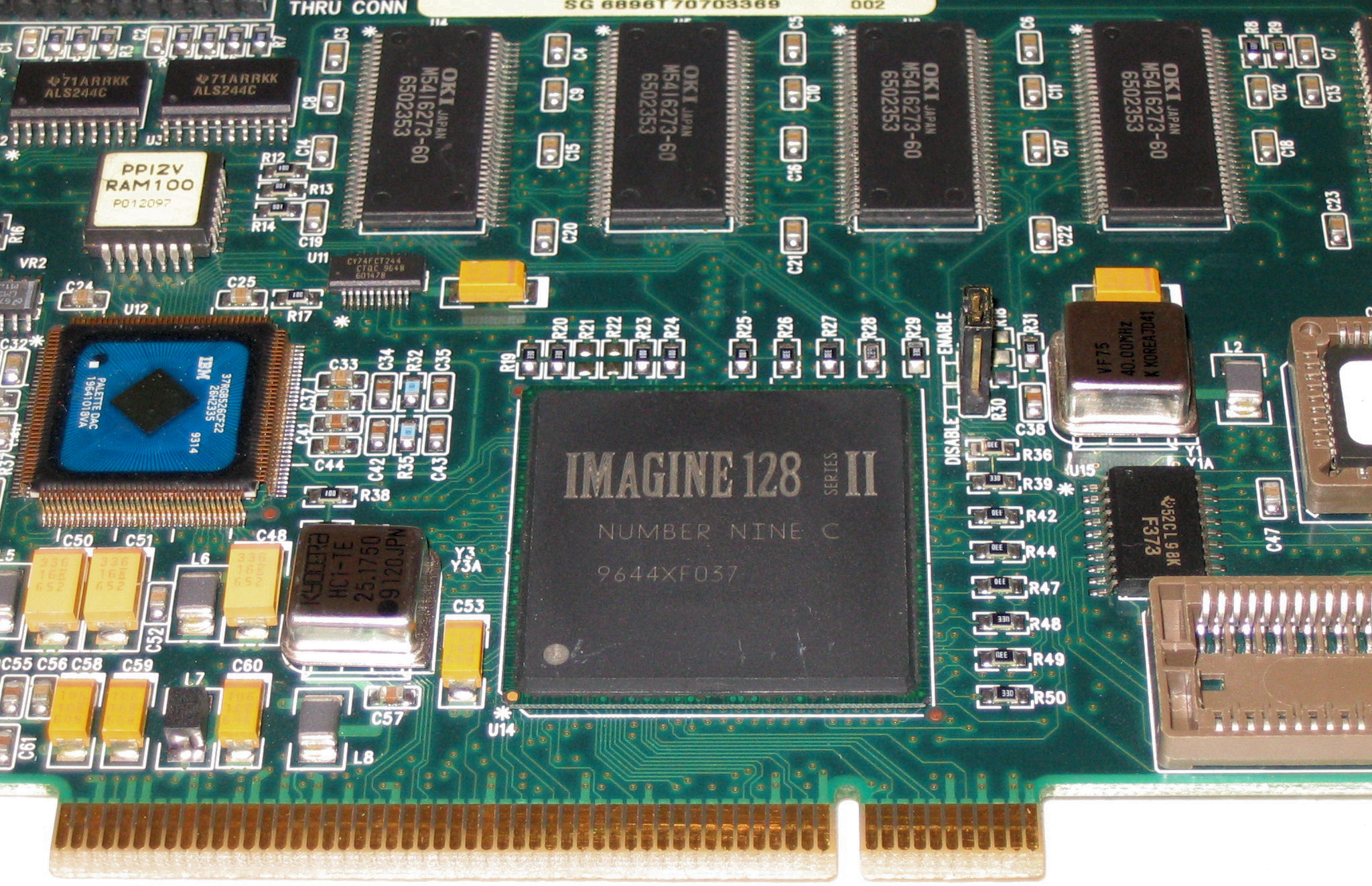
Imagine 128 Series II

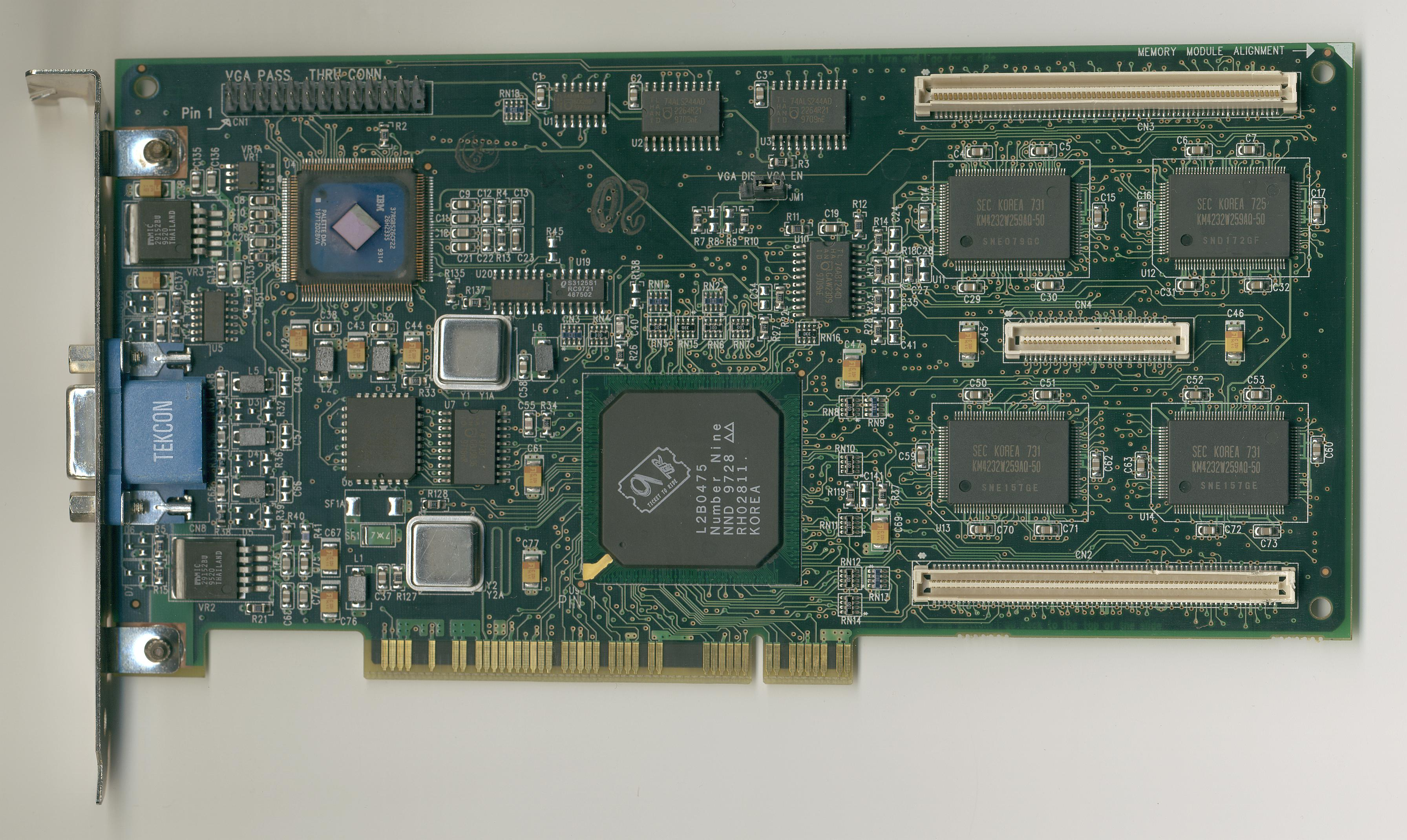
Revolution 3D (Ticket to Ride), PCI bus

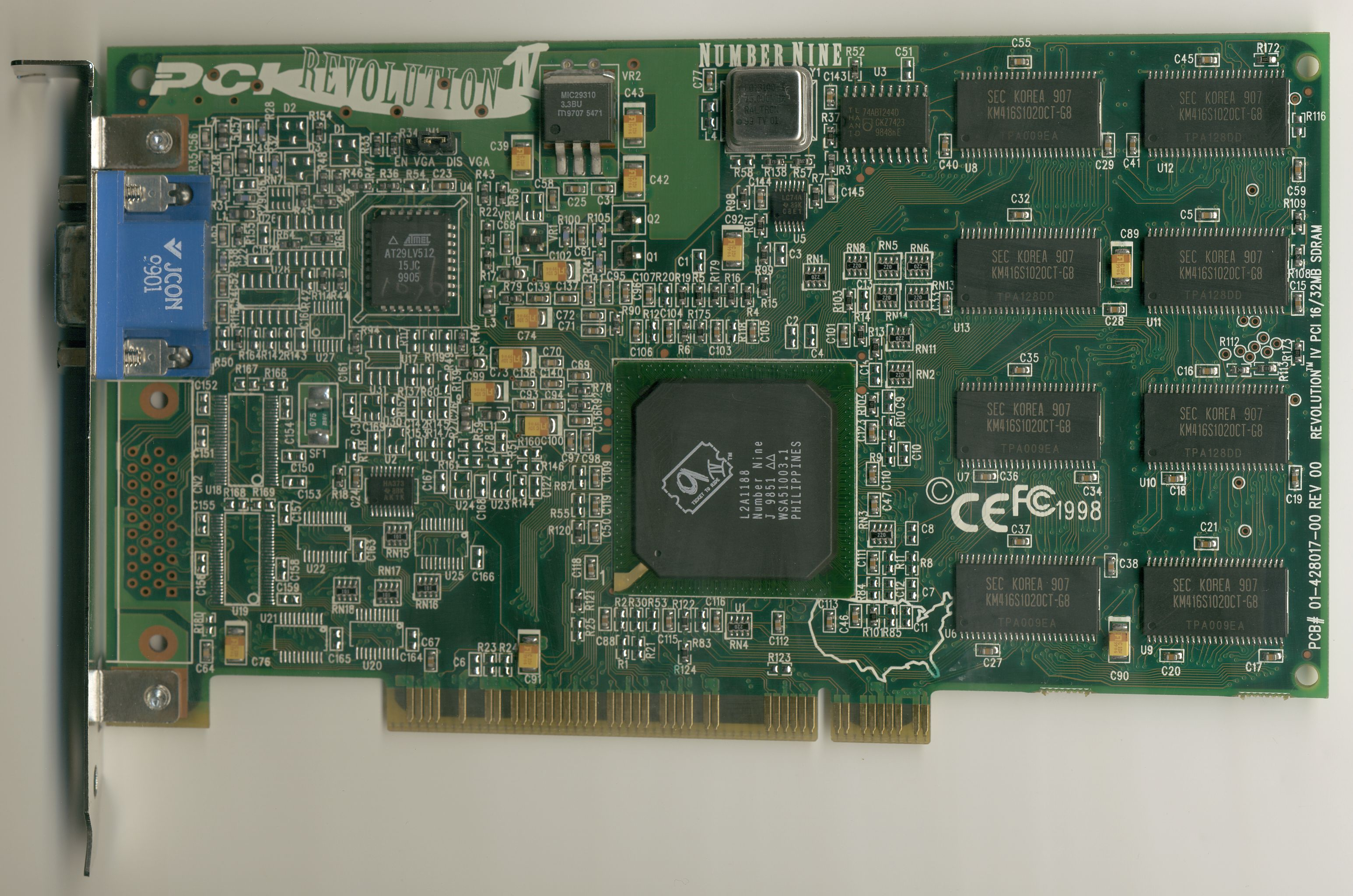
Revolution IV (Ticket to Ride 4), PCI bus

The Imagine series GPUs (also called graphics accelerators) were Number Nine's own in-house designs. The Imagine series went through four generations:

1. Imagine 128 (Imagine. Internal codename: "Blackbird").
2. Imagine 128-II (Imagine2. Internal codename: "Silver Hammer").
3. T2R (marked "Ticket to Ride"; sometimes marked "Imagine-3")
4. T2R4 (marked "Ticket to Ride IV").

The Imagine 128 GPU introduced a full 128-bit graphics processor—GPU, internal processor bus, and memory bus were all 128 bits. However, there was no, or very little, hardware support for 3D graphics operations.

The Imagine 128-II added Gouraud shading, 32-bit Z-buffering, double display buffering, and a 256-bit video rendering engine.

The Ticket to Ride (Imagine-3) supported WRAM and both the AGP and PCI buses, had a 3D floating point setup engine, bilinear filtering and perspective correction, Gouraud shading, alpha blending, interpolated fogging, specular lighting, double and triple display buffering, 16-, 24- and 32-bit Z-buffering, MPEG-1 and MPEG-2, and hardware MIP mapping.

The Ticket to Ride IV included an integrated 250 MHz RAMDAC, support for up to 32 MiB SDRAM, full scene anti-aliasing, per pixel fog, specular, and alpha effects, 10-level detail per pixel MIP mapping, bilinear and trilinear filtering, 8 bits per texel, 8 KB on-chip texture cache, hardware MPEG-1 and MPEG-2, and a full IEEE 754 floating point pipeline 3D rendering setup engine.

Number Nine graphics accelerators were used on the following Number Nine model video cards:

| #9 Model | #9 GPU | Memory | PC Bus Architecture |
|---|---|---|---|
| Imagine 128 | Imagine 128 | 4 MB, 8 MB VRAM | PCI |
| Imagine 128 Series 2 | Imagine 128-II | 4 MB, 8M H-VRAM | PCI |
| Imagine 128 Series 2e | Imagine 128-II | 4 MB EDO DRAM | PCI |
| Revolution 3D | T2R | 4 MB or 8 MB (base), 12 MB, 16 MB WRAM | PCI, AGP |
| Revolution IV | T2R4 | 16 MB, 32 MB SDRAM | PCI, AGP |
| Revolution IV-FP | T2R4 | 32 MB SDRAM | PCI, AGP |

These 1990s video cards were Number Nine's flagship cards of their day (the Imagine 128 and 128 Series 2 were very expensive). None required a heatsink on the GPU. The original Imagine 128 was introduced in 1994. The Revolution IV was introduced in 1998.

In addition to a standard analog VGA connector, the Revolution IV-FP (also called the Revolution IV-1600SW) had an OpenLDI digital interface connector for the Silicon Graphics, Inc (SGI) 1600SW digital flat panel monitor. The Revolution IV-FP was one of only a few standard video adapters with the OpenLDI interface for SGI's 1600SW digital flat panel monitor (some others were 3Dlabs Oxygen VX1-1600SW, I-O DATA GA-NF30/PCI, and Siemens Nixdorf S26361-D964 cards in some Siemens Nixdorf computer). SGI's 1600SW video adapters were proprietary (on board) to their O2, 320, and 540 graphics workstations. Formac made a limited number of PCI cards with OpenLDI for Apple Macs.

The OpenLDI interface is neither physically nor electrically compatible with the modern DVI-D interface. This was the early days of digital video connections and there were several competing, incompatible standards. OpenLDI for stand-alone displays disappeared, but several aftermarket manufacturers made adapters to convert OpenLDI to DVI-D so more modern video cards would work with the 1600SW monitor.

The 1600SW monitor was far ahead of its time and was eagerly sought long after it was out of production. For this reason, for a time, Revolution IV-FP and Oxygen VX1-1600SW video cards commanded a premium price in the used market, long after they were out of production.

=== Number Nine Video Cards using S3 Graphics processors ===
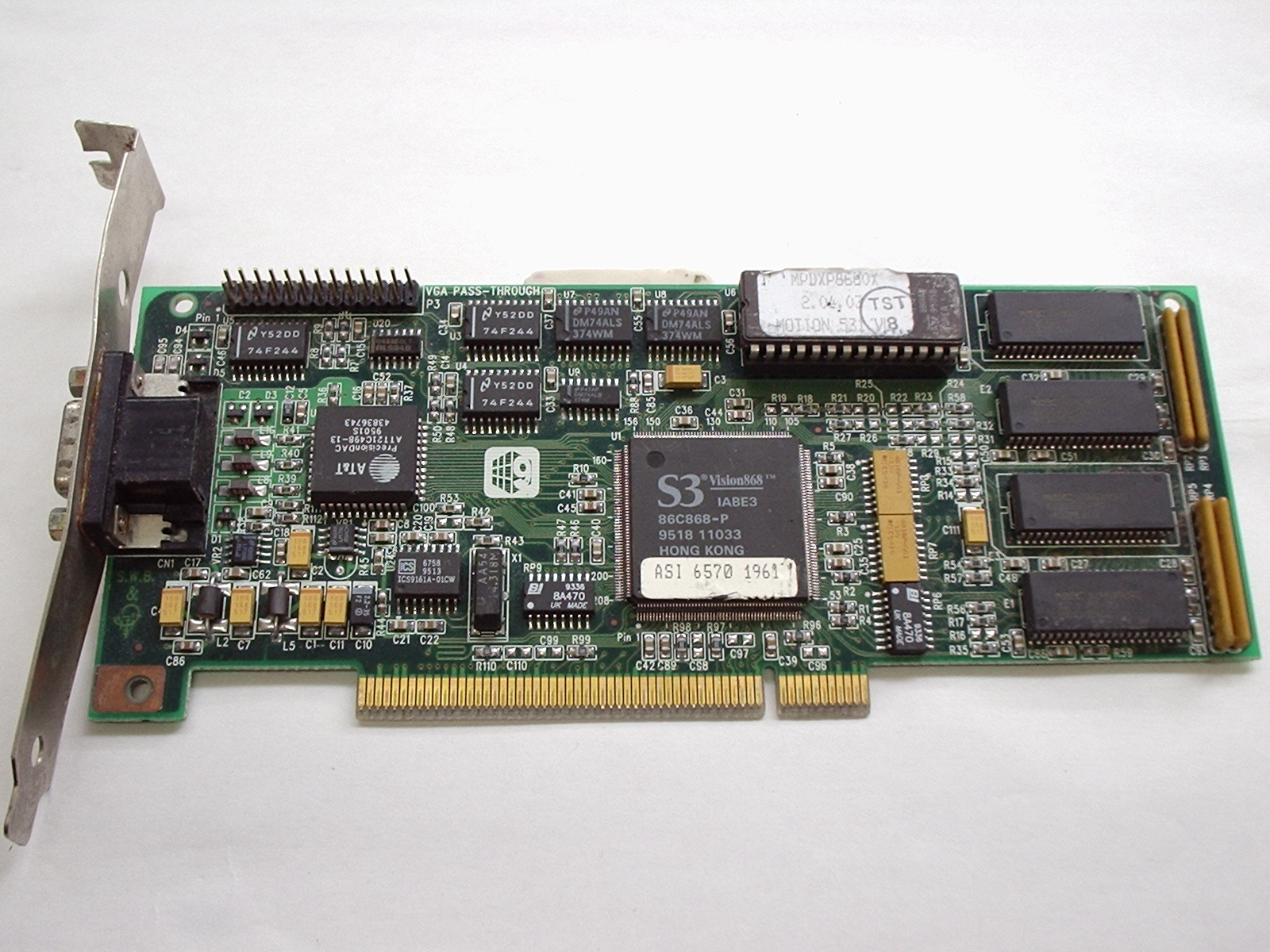
GXE 64 (Vision864) 2 MB DRAM

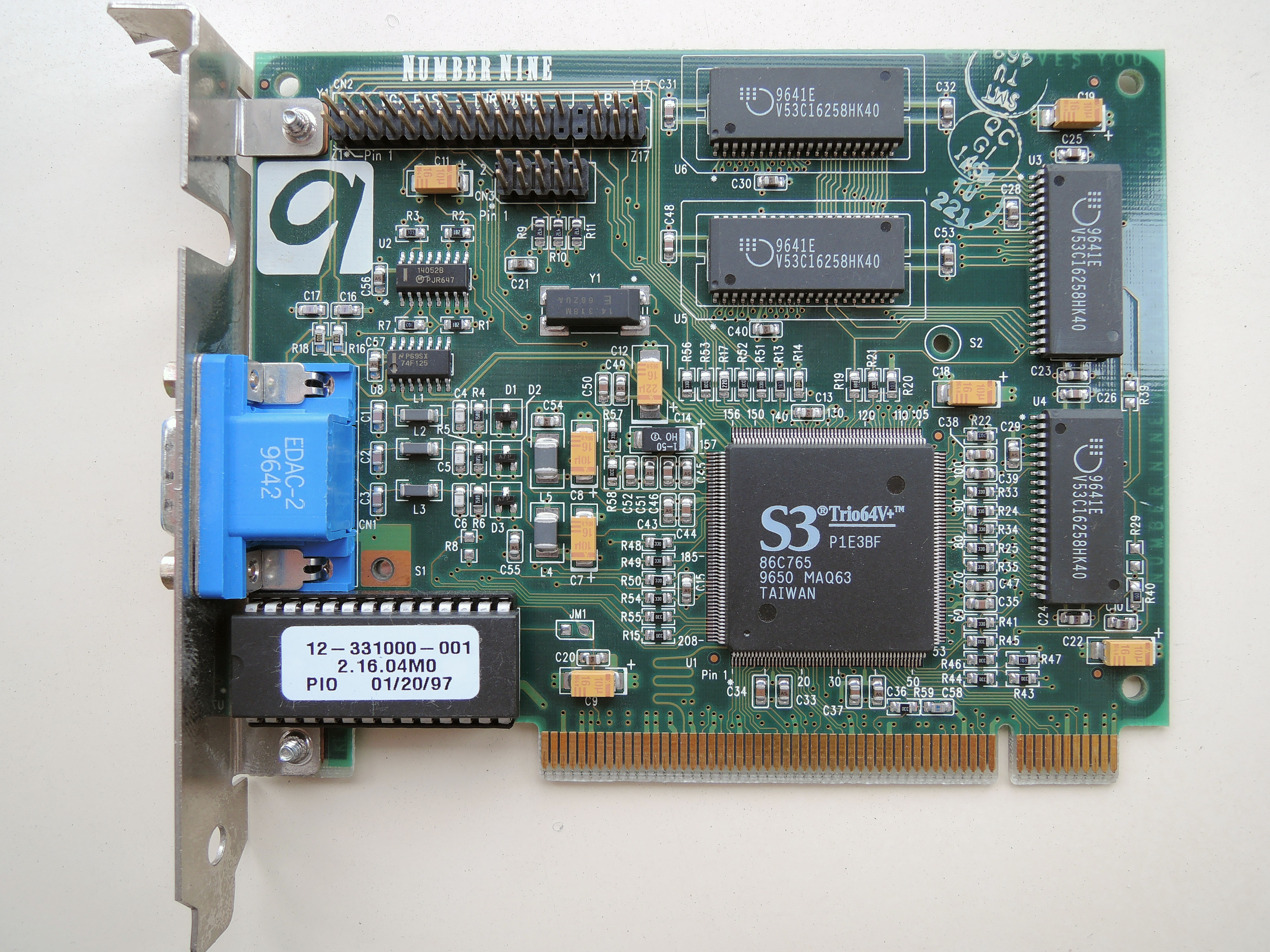
Motion 331 PCI (S3 Trio64V+)

Number Nine had a close business relationship with S3 Graphics throughout the 1990s. While the Imagine series GPUs and cards were Number Nine's flagship products, contemporaneously, Number Nine produced a series of less expensive video graphics cards using S3's GPUs. The S3-based cards were usually introduced in groups of three, at three price points below the Imagine cards. They carried the same model name, but different model numbers and GPUs. Except for the SR9, Number Nine's last, best S3 card, none of these video cards had heatsinks on the graphics processing chip (GPU).

The S3-based video cards were, in approximate order of introduction:

| #9 Model | S3 GPU | Memory | PC Bus Architecture | Notes |
|---|---|---|---|---|
| GXE | 928 | 1 MB, 2 MB, 3 MB, 4 MB VRAM | ISA, VLB, PCI | |
| GXE 64 | 864 (Vision864) | 1 MB, 2 MB DRAM | ISA?, VLB, PCI | |
| GXE 64 Pro | 964 (Vision964) | 2 MB, 4 MB VRAM | ISA?, VLB, PCI | |
| GXE 64 Trio | 764 (Trio64) | 1 MB, 2 MB DRAM | ISA?, VLB, PCI | |
| Vision 330 | 764 (Trio64) | 1 MB, 2 MB DRAM | VLB, PCI | |
| Motion 331 | 765 (Trio64V+) | 1 MB, 2 MB DRAM | VLB, PCI | |
| Motion 531 | 868 (Vision868) | 1 MB, 2 MB DRAM | VLB, PCI | |
| Motion 771 | 968 (Vision968) | 2 MB, 4 MB VRAM | VLB, PCI | |
| Reality 332 | 325 (ViRGE) | 2 MB EDO DRAM | PCI | |
| Reality 772 | 988 (ViRGE VX) | 2 MB, 4 MB VRAM | PCI | |
| Reality 334 | 357 (ViRGE GX2) | 4 MB SGRAM | PCI, AGP | |
| SR9 (SDRAM) | 394 (Savage4 LT, small heatsink on GPU) | 8 MB SDRAM | AGP | (some OEM) |
| SR9 (SDRAM) | 397 (Savage4 Pro, small heatsink on GPU) | 16 MB, 32 MB SDRAM | AGP | (retail) |
| SR9 (SGRAM) | 398 (Savage4 Xtreme, small heatsink on GPU) | 8 MB?, 16 MB SGRAM | AGP | (OEM only?) |

=== Number Nine Video Cards with heatsinks ===
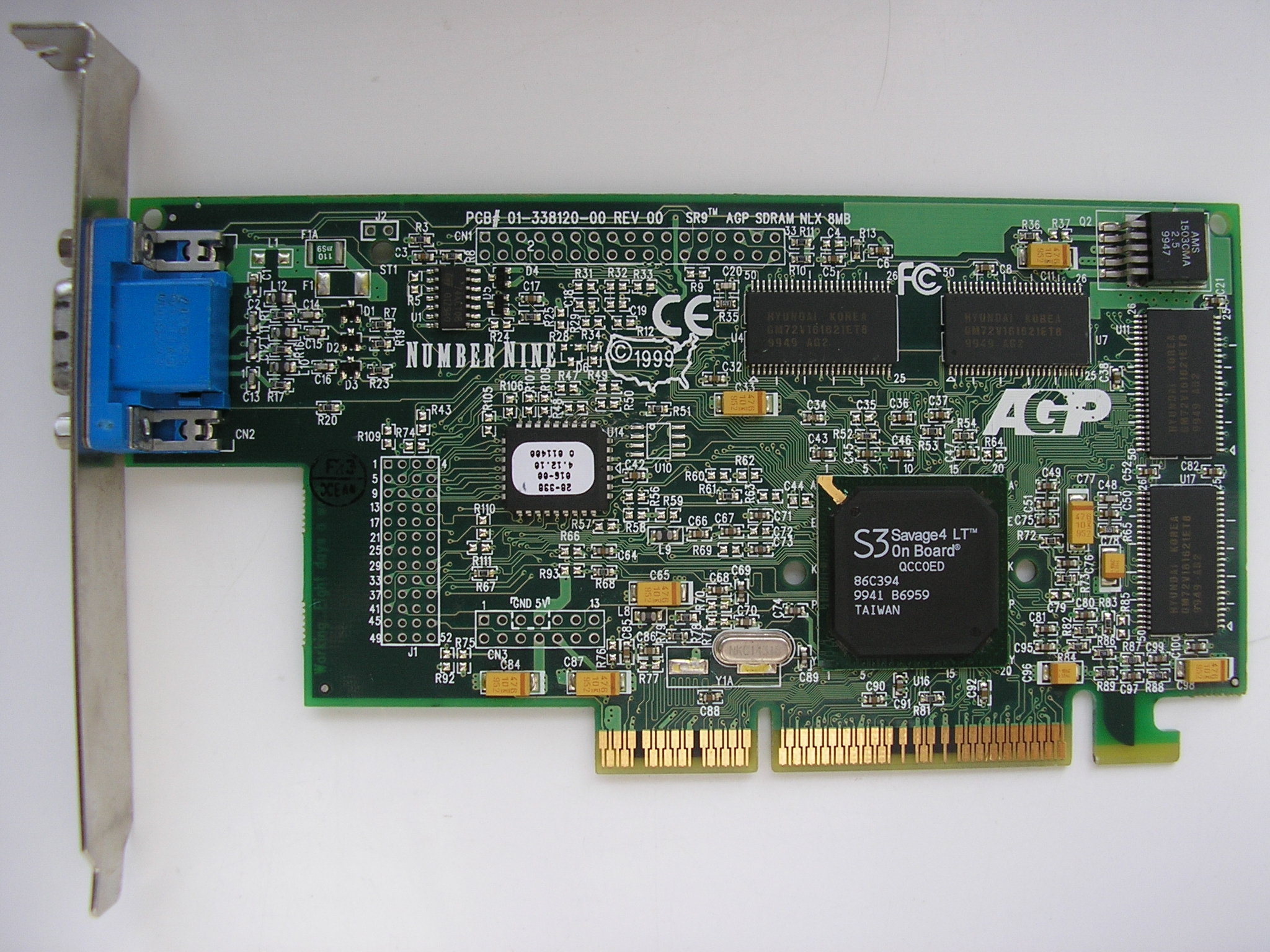
SR9 SDRAM NLX 8MB (heatsink removed) with S3 Savage4 LT chip

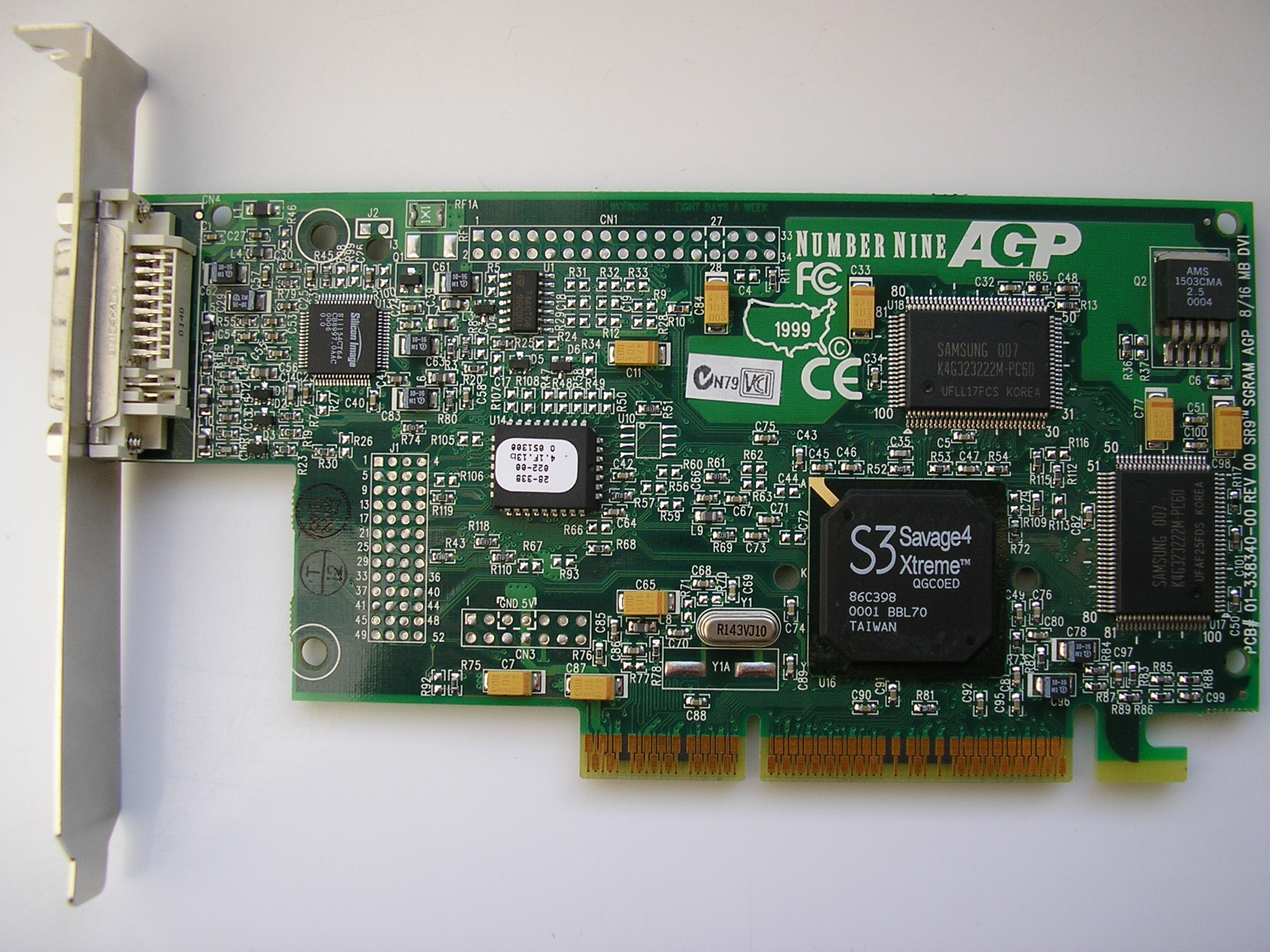
SR9 SGRAM 16MB DVI (heatsink removed) with S3 Savage4 Xtreme chip

Number Nine's last two graphics cards were the only ones to require heatsinks on the GPU. Both outperformed the Revolution IV.

- The SR9 was Number Nine's last retail card. It used an S3 Savage4 GPU with a small heatsink on the GPU (the SDRAM one with VGA connector is Savage4 LT, the SGRAM one with DVI connector is Savage4 Xtreme).
- An OEM-only AGP card using an Nvidia TNT2-M64 GPU and [16 MB? or] 32 MB SDRAM. The heatsink is larger than the one on the SR9. This Nvidia-based card has been variously called (probably unofficially) the "M64" or "Pepper M32," but it was never a retail, end-user product.

=== PixelFusion joint venture ===
On April 20, 1999, Bankboston Business Credit announced it had provided $15 Million for Number Nine Visual Technology.

On August 9, 1999, PixelFusion Ltd. and Number Nine Visual Technology Corp. announced they had entered into a relationship whereby Number Nine would use PixelFusion's FUZION 150 chip to design a very high-end 3D graphics accelerator card for AGP Pro-equipped PCs. The card would use 128M to 1024M Rambus RDRAM, while the FUZION 150 chip would contain 24 megabits of embedded DRAM. The product was to be delivered in the first half of 2000. However, no retail products were made following the announcement.

== See also ==
- List of defunct graphics chips and card companies
