= ACRTC HD63484 =

GPU chip created by Hitachi

- Release date: 1984
- Manufactured by: Hitachi
- Transistors: 60,000

Hitachi LSI HD63484 Advanced CRT Controller chip (ACRTC) is a GPU created by Hitachi in 1984 that supports 4K display resolution.

== Description ==
The LSI HD63484 was built in 2 μm CMOS technology and had about 60,000 MOSFETs and could operate at 8 MHz. ACRTC introduced a screen resolution of 4096×4096 pixels at 1-bit color depth (monochrome), or 1024×1024 at 16-bit color (65,536 colors). Focused on computer graphics for the emerging desktop publishing market with bitmap printing. The chip had the ability to program the synchronization signal of CRT monitors. It could support up to 2 megabytes of video memory and offered an asynchronous DMA bus interface that could be mapped to 16-bit ISA and VME buses.

== See also ==
- NEC μPD7220
- TMS34010
- List of Intel GPUs

== Literature ==
- Baraa Al-Hilali. Mathematical Representation of Color Spaces and Its Role in Communication Systems. Journal of Applied Mathematics. Hindawi, 2020.
- Amit Joshi, Nilanjan Dey, Simon Sherratt, Xin-She Yang. Proceedings of Sixth International Congress on Information and Communication Technology. ICICT 2021, London, Volume 2. Springer Nature Singapore, 2021. ISBN 9789811623806.
- Gustavo Henrique Cervi. Pipeline Metagenômico Com o Uso de Algoritmo de Compressão Lossy e Matching Heurístico Não-Determinístico. Porto Alegre, 2022.
- Jon Peddie. The History of the GPU - Steps to Invention. Springer Nature, 2023. ISBN 9783031109683.
