= TMS34010 =

Microprocessor with dedicated graphics instructions

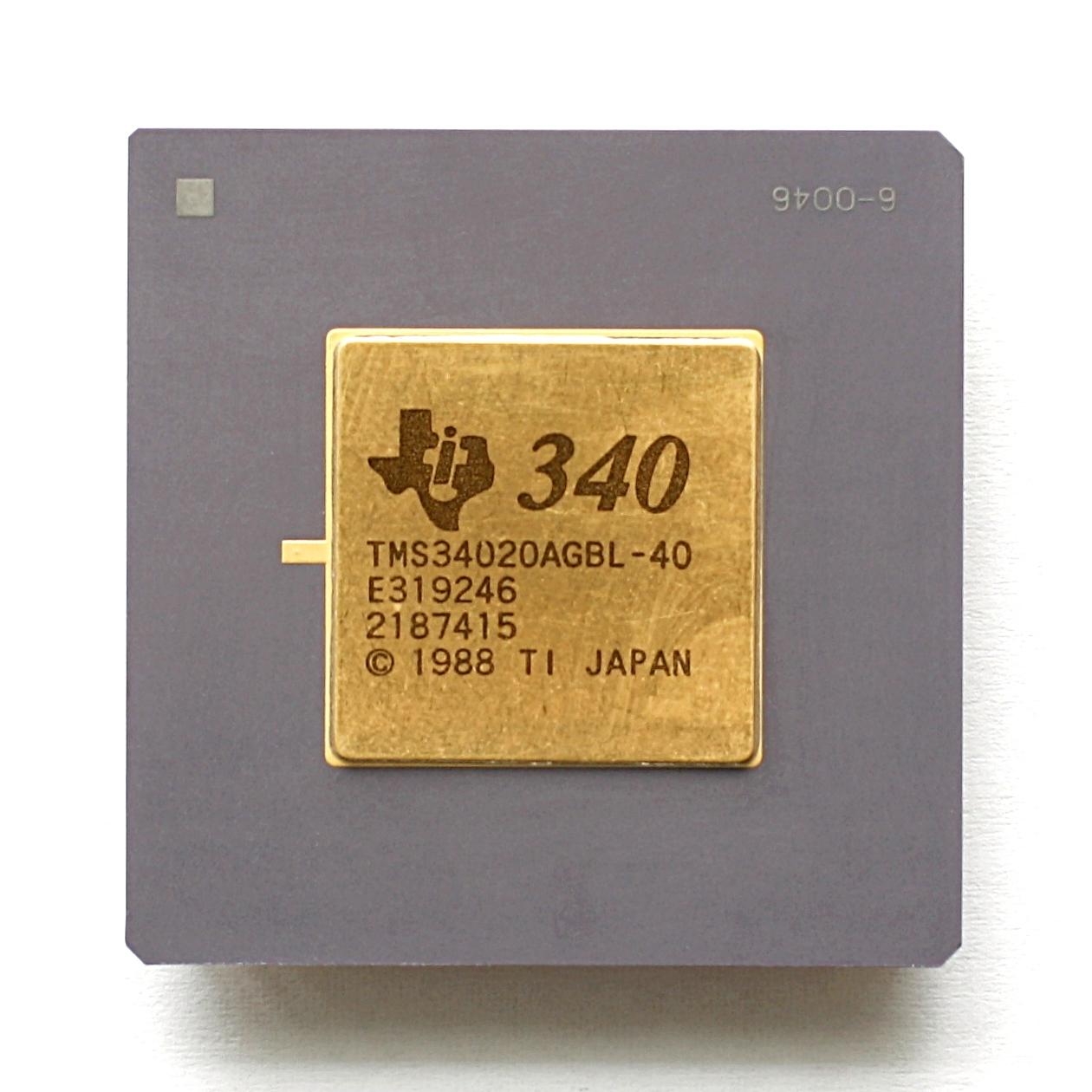
The followup to the TMS34010, the TMS34020

The TMS34010, developed by Texas Instruments and released in 1986, was the first programmable graphics processor integrated circuit. While specialized graphics hardware existed earlier, such as blitters, the TMS34010 chip is a microprocessor which includes graphics-oriented instructions, making it a combination of a CPU and what would later be called a GPU.

The chip was central to over twenty-five arcade video games from the late 1980s through the mid-1990s, primarily from Atari Games and Midway Games. It was first used in Narc in 1988, then other games including Hard Drivin', Smash TV, Mortal Kombat, and NBA Jam. It was also part of computer workstation video accelerator boards in the 1990s.

Texas Instruments' next major evolution of the chip was the TMS34020 and a companion floating point coprocessor. The emphasis of the combo was 3D rendering, but it was also used in place of the TMS34010 in the non-polygonal arcade games Revolution X and Battletoads Arcade.

== History ==
The design of the TMS34010 was led by Karl Guttag, who previously worked on the TMS9918 video display controller first used in the TI-99/4A. Development took place at TI facilities in Bedford (UK) and Houston (US). First silicon was working in Houston in December 1985, with shipment of development boards to IBM's workstation facility in Kingston, New York, in January 1986.

Midway Games (Note: Initially the restarted Williams Electronics division of Midway.) was a prolific user of the chip in arcade video games beginning with the run and gun Narc in 1988. Subsequent Midway games built around the chip include Smash TV (1990), Mortal Kombat (1992), and NBA Jam (1993). The 3D driving simulator Hard Drivin' (1989) from Atari Games contains two of the processors. Atari Games used the chip in other flat-shaded 3D games: S.T.U.N. Runner (1989), Race Drivin' (1990), and Steel Talons (1991).

TI developed the Texas Instruments Graphics Architecture (TIGA) specification for professional-level video accelerator cards for IBM PC compatibles, of which the TMS34010 was central.

A follow-up processor, the TMS34020, was released in 1989. The chip can be paired with the TMS34082A floating point coprocessor to render three-dimensional graphics. It is used in Midway's 1994 Revolution X arcade game, even though the game is not fully 3D.

== Technical details ==
The TMS34010 is a bit addressable, 32-bit processor, with two register files, each with fifteen registers and sharing a sixteenth stack pointer. The instruction set supports drawing into two-dimensional bitmaps, arbitrary variable-width data, conversion of pixel data to different bit depths, and arithmetic operations on pixels. Positions in bitmaps can be specified either as X, Y coordinates or as addresses. The PIXBLT instruction handles drawing pixels, including Boolean and other operations for combining pixel data, and most of the microcode for graphics functions is to support it.

The TMS34010 can execute general purpose programs and is supported by an ANSI C compiler. Most of the arcade video games that use the processor were written in native assembly language, not C.

== Uses ==
=== Arcade video games ===
The TMS34010 is used in many coin-operated arcade video games manufactured from 1988 to 1997. Several games use the TMS34020.

Atari Games

- Hard Drivin' (1989), uses two TMS34010 chips: one for rendering and one for simulation
- S.T.U.N. Runner (1989)
- Race Drivin' (1990)
- Steel Talons (1991)

Williams / Midway

- NARC (1988)
- Smash TV (1990)
- Trog (1990)
- High Impact Football (1990)
- Strike Force (1991)
- Super High Impact (1991)
- Terminator 2: Judgment Day (1991)
- Total Carnage (1992)
- Mortal Kombat (1992)
- Mortal Kombat II (1993)
- NBA Jam (1993)
- Revolution X (1994), uses TMS34020
- Mortal Kombat 3 (1995)
- Ultimate Mortal Kombat 3 (1995)
- WWF WrestleMania (1995)
- NHL: 2-on-2 Open Ice Challenge (1995)
- NBA Hangtime (1996)
- NBA Maximum Hangtime (1996)
- Rampage World Tour (1997)

MicroProse Games

- F-15 Strike Eagle (1991)
- B.O.T.S.S.: Battle of the Solar System (1992)

Other

- AmeriDarts (1989)
- Battletoads (1994) uses TMS34020

=== Video accelerators ===
The TMS chips are compliant with the 1989 Texas Instruments Graphics Architecture (TIGA) standard, and in the early 1990s were used in professional-level video coprocessor boards for MS-DOS, Macintosh, Windows, and SCO Unix. In a 1991 article on graphics adapters, PC Magazine reported that the fastest boards for regenerating AutoCAD test images were based on the TMS34010.

The Aura Scuzzygraph, Radius PowerView, and Radius SuperView external SCSI graphics cards for Mac computers are based on the TMS34010.

One of the graphics options for the 1988 Sun386i workstation, the CG5 video card, uses the TMS34010.

The Amiga A2410 graphics card uses the TMS34010 and was included in the Amiga UNIX 2500UX and 3000UX UNIX workstations. It was developed in conjunction with the University of Lowell. When running Amiga UNIX, the card supports the X Window System and gives a high resolution 8-bit display. The card can also be used when running Amiga OS, with support libraries and some Retargetable Graphics implementations.

=== Game console ===
In 1987, TI demonstrated real-time 3D games with stereo sound effects on a personal computer, using a small TMS34010 adapter card called "The Flippy". The Flippy was designed as the basis of a game development system for consoles and as an IBM PC compatible gaming card in its own right. Texas Instruments engineer Michael Denio wrote The Adventures of Captain Pixel as a demo for the system. In 1988, he released a similar game, The Adventures of Captain Comic, as shareware for MS-DOS.

TI made an unsuccessful effort in 1987 and 1988 to convince game makers such as Nintendo and Sega to write 3D games and create a new console market.

== TMS34020 ==
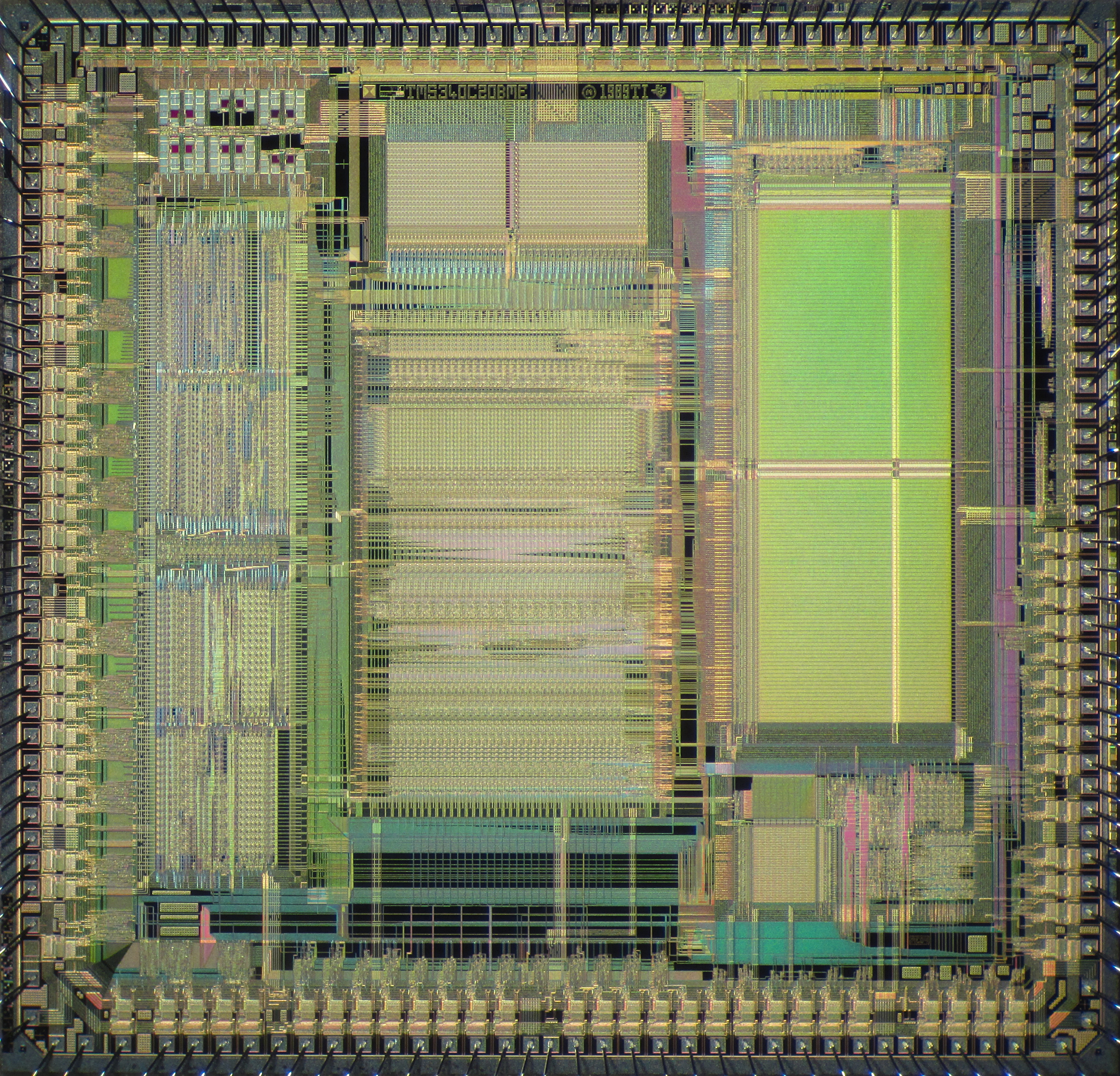
Die of TMS34020

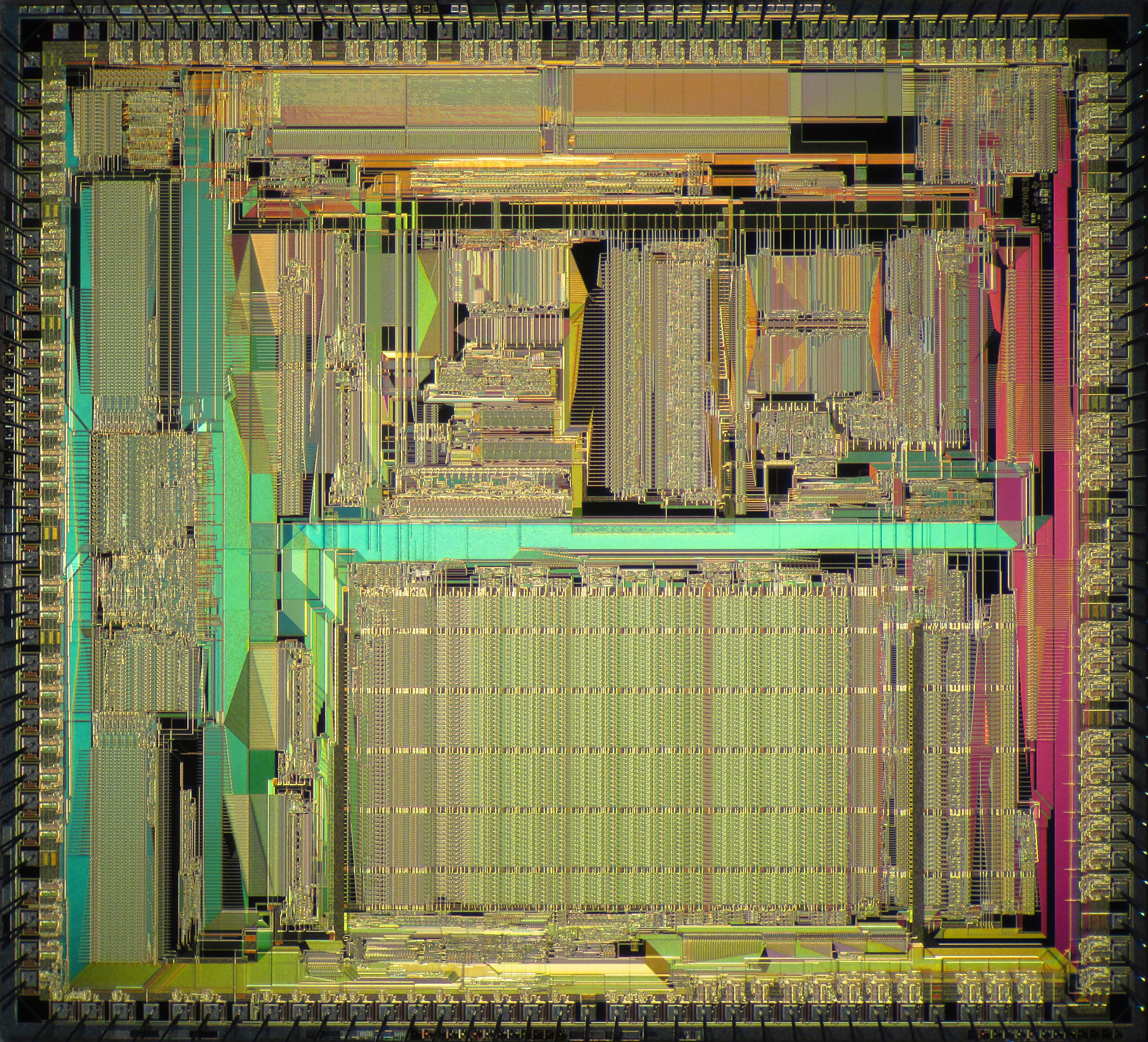
TMS34082A floating point coprocessor

The successor to the TMS34010, the TMS34020 (1988), provides several enhancements including an interface for a special graphics floating point coprocessor, the TMS34082 (1989). The primary function of the TMS34082 is to allow the TMS340 architecture to generate high quality three-dimensional graphics. The performance level of 60 million vertices per second was advanced at the time.

The TMS34020 is used in at least two arcade video games: Revolution X (1994) and Battletoads Arcade (1994).

The Rambrandt Amiga extension card from Progressive Peripherals & Software supported up to four TMS34020, for use in virtual reality simulations.
