= Evans Data Corporation =

- Type: Private
- Industry: Market Research
- Founded: 1998
- Founder: Janel Garvin
- Headquarters: Santa Cruz, California, United States
- Key people: Janel Garvin (CEO) Michael Rasalan (Director of Research); Esther Schindler Joe McKendrick
- Products: DevMetric, Multi-client and Custom Surveys
- Services: Targeted Analytics
- Website: EvansData.com

Evans Data Corporation, also known as Evans Data or EDC, is a Santa Cruz, California based market research firm that specializes in software development. It produces multi-client and custom research, including strategic surveys targeting cloud computing, mobile computing, developer relations and developer marketing in Asia Pacific, Europe, the Middle East, Africa, and North America. Its other products and services include DevMetric, a user review site launched in 2012, and Evans Data's annual Developer Relations Conference, held each spring.

== History ==
Founded in 1998 by Janel Garvin, Evans Data Corporation provides market research, market intelligence, and strategic planning in the software development industry. It is now recognized as the industry leader in market intelligence focused on all areas of development from software to hardware to mobility.

Since many manufacturers and vendors desire to keep a finger on the pulse of the development community, Evans Data surveys software developers with the intent of understanding a technical segment of the software industry. Citing "the nature of development and the quickly changing technologies that form their world," Evans Data Corporation specializes in conducting market research in the IT and development community. Due to this, the company analyzes technology trends and attitudes.

== Research ==
=== Syndicated surveys ===
Evans Data Corporation publishes several annual and semiannual reports. These are:

Global Development Survey Series: EDC's oldest continuous report, the North American Development Survey, is published semiannually as part of their Global Development Series, once in the spring and again in the fall. The Global Series also includes reports for the Asia Pacific region, including the Indian subcontinent, Australia, and Oceania; and Europe, the Middle East, and Africa. The question set for all regions is the same and at least 400 software developers are interviewed for each region.

Emerging Markets Development Series: Providing a particular focus on China, Eastern Europe, India, and Latin America, this survey report has the same question set as the Global series.

Mobile Development Series: A semi-annual survey of over 400 developers worldwide who are actively engaged in mobile development. This series was started in 2003 and contains both trending data and dynamic content current to the flux and change in mobile development.

Cloud Development Survey Series: Started in 2009, this semi-annual survey series of over 400 developers active in Cloud development or deployment.

Evans Data also publishes annual reports focusing on Developer Marketing and Developer Relations Programs. The latter of these two reports is the focal point for Evans Data Corporation's annual Developer Relations Conference, held in the early spring of each calendar year.

==== Targeted Analytics ====
The Targeted Analytics team at Evans Data Corp. offers clients a secondary research service, providing extensive additional data analysis that is not included in the multi-client survey reports.

=== Custom research ===
Evans Data Corporation also conducts private custom research for clients interested in any aspect of software development. Capabilities include worldwide survey reach, translations, questionnaire design, complete research project design and management, sophisticated analytical techniques such as conjoint analysis, max diff and clustering, plus full reporting.

== Other products, services, and events ==
=== DevMetric ===
DevMetric is a user review site in which software developers share reviews about development tools. Launched in 2012, DevMetric focuses on tools by platform as well as by their stated purpose. The DevMetric site is organized by two means: by platform (including Tools for Cloud, Tools for Mobile, Microsoft Windows, Linux, macOS, and mainframes) and by twenty-two tool types (e.g. debugging, design, dynamic analysis)

=== Developer Relations Conference ===
Conducted annually, the Developer Relations Conference hosts developer relations experts from leading companies in the software, telecom and web markets in order to facilitate discussion about best practices and reveal the techniques behind developer program successes. Keynotes are from major industry companies with respect to the conference's central theme. Most recently, Evans Data hosted keynotes from AT&T, Google, IBM, Intel, and Microsoft. Conference sponsors include technology news leaders Application Developer Trends (ADTMag.com), The Code Project, Dr. Dobb's Journal, and Integration Developer News (iDevNews.com).
