= Diamond Multimedia =

American company

- Founded: 1982; 44 years ago
- Founders: Chong Moon Lee
- Headquarters: Chatsworth, California, U.S.
- Products: Graphics cards, sound cards, Digital audio players
- Parent: PowerColor
- Website: www.diamondmm.com

Diamond Multimedia is an American company that specializes in many forms of multimedia technology. They have produced graphics cards, motherboards, modems, sound cards and MP3 players; however, the company began with the production of the TrackStar, an add-on card for IBM PC compatibles which emulates Apple II computers. They were one of the major players in the 2D and early 3D graphics card competition throughout the 1990s and early 2000s.

Diamond Multimedia is a subsidiary of Tul Corporation.

== History ==
The company was founded by Chong Moon Lee with H. H. Huh, who acted as the technical designer. Diamond Multimedia later merged with S3, Incorporated in 1999 after a long-time cooperative business arrangement, when S3 decided to expand their business from producing graphics chipsets to manufacturing retail graphics cards. The move paralleled the 1999 3dfx purchase of STB Systems, which changed 3dfx from a graphics chipset supplier to companies including Diamond, into a vertically integrated graphics vendor and direct competitor to S3. However, the first major product after the merger, branded as the S3 Savage 2000, was a commercial failure. Growth in the add-on sound card market, also an ongoing Diamond business, was tempered by the 2000 bankruptcy of Aureal Semiconductor and subsequent asset purchase by vertically integrated Creative Technologies.

With these market failures, the new combined Diamond/S3 company decided to change direction and leave the PC addon-board market. SONICblue was formed. Diamond Multimedia resurfaced in 2003 after the brand and assets had been purchased by Best Data. Diamond again built expansion boards.

The company was the defendant in a significant copyright case for its Rio digital music player, which the Recording Industry Association of America claimed infringed copyrights; the Ninth Circuit deemed it to be a fair use, however, in RIAA v. Diamond.

== Graphics cards ==
=== Speedstar ===
Diamond's earliest line, now defunct, was the SpeedStar series, initially based on the Tseng Labs ET4000AX chipset, and expanded further in additional releases. The SpeedStar line was launched as a series of high-performance ISA graphics cards that excelled in MS-DOS applications up through the early 1990s. However, as Microsoft Windows gained market share and newer graphics products entered the market, it was later relegated to the cheaper, value-oriented products and the SpeedStar branding was expanded to other products.

Partial listing of Speedstar-branded models

- Diamond SpeedStar Tseng Labs ET4000AX ISA - Older model, doesn't support true color
- Diamond SpeedStar 24 Tseng Labs ET4000AX ISA - Newer model with the same chipset but different DAC, supports true color
- Diamond SpeedStar 24X WD90C31 ISA
- Diamond SpeedStar Pro Cirrus Logic CL-GD5426/5428 ISA/VLB
- Diamond SpeedStar 64 Cirrus Logic CL-GD5434 ISA/PCI
- Diamond SpeedStar Pro SE Cirrus Logic CL-GD5430 VLB/PCI
- Diamond SpeedStar SuperVGA Tseng Labs ET4000 ISA
- Diamond SpeedStar A50 SiS 6326 AGP
- Diamond SpeedStar A55 S3 Trio3D AGP
- Diamond SpeedStar A70 SiS 6326 AGP
- Diamond SpeedStar A90 S3 Savage4 AGP
- Diamond SpeedStar A200 S3 Savage4 AGP

=== Stealth ===
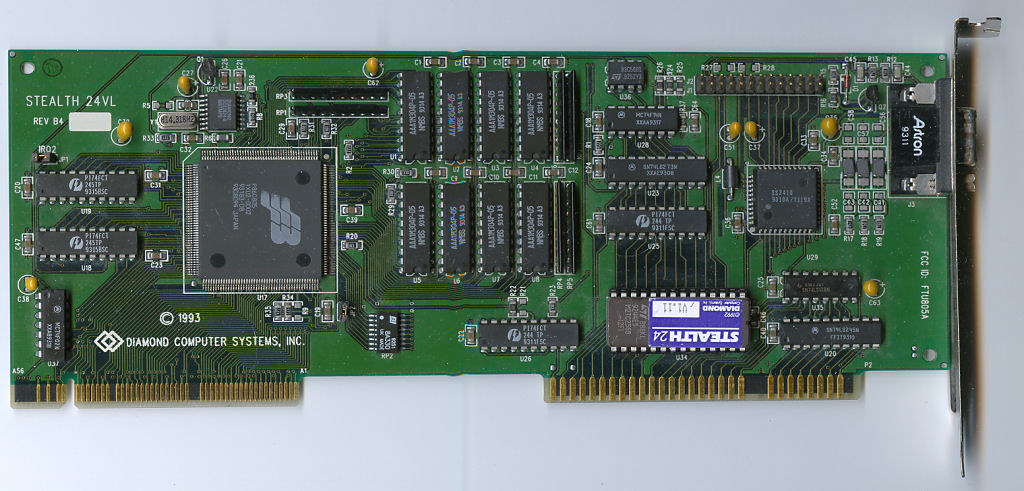
Diamond Stealth24

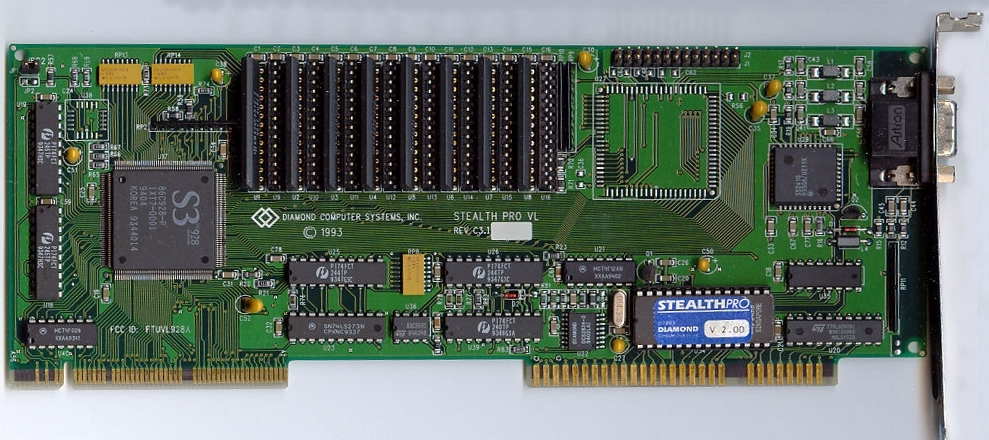
Diamond Stealth Pro

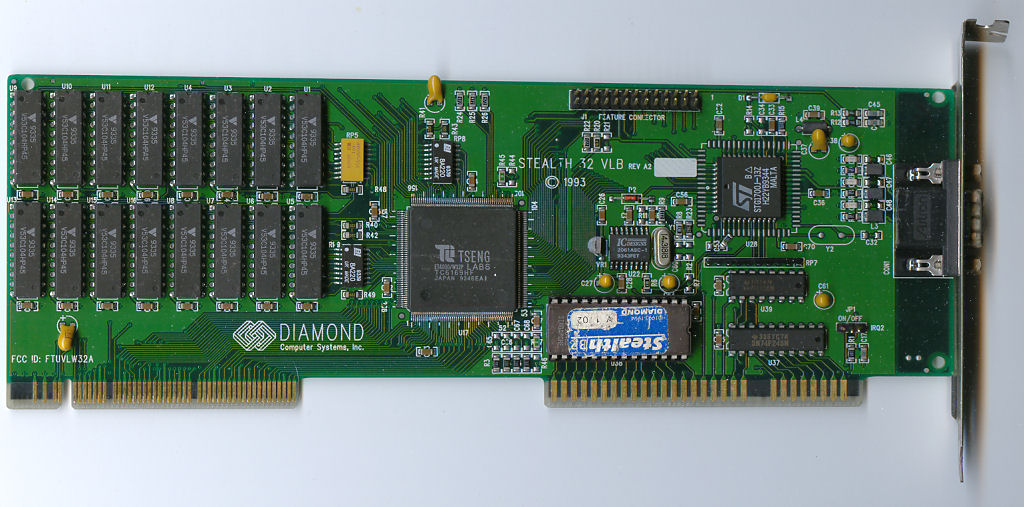
Diamond Stealth32

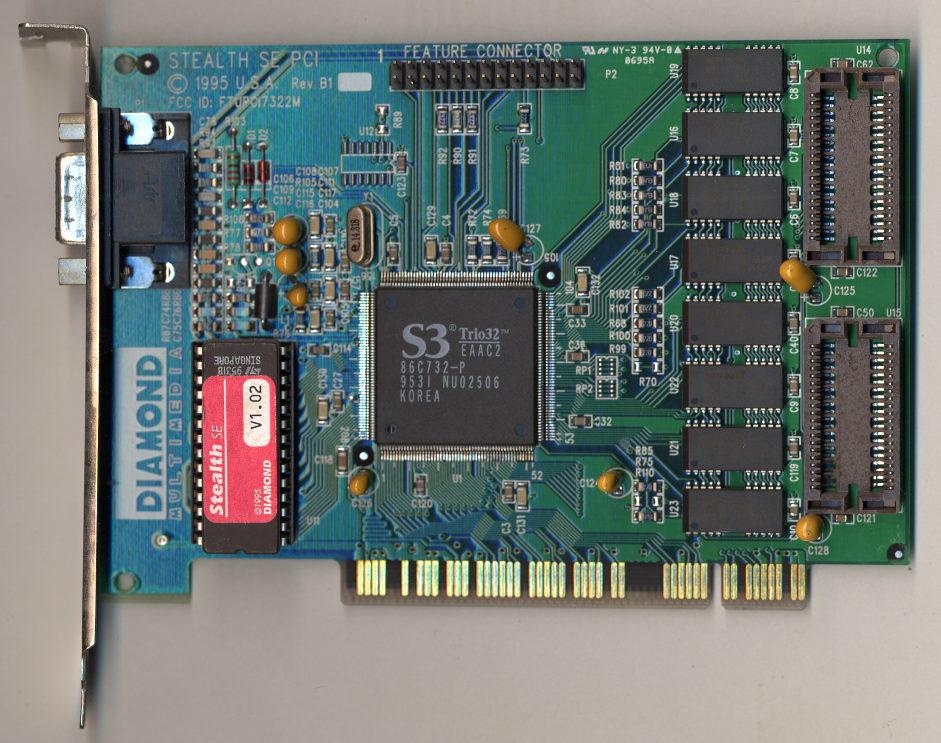
Diamond Stealth SE

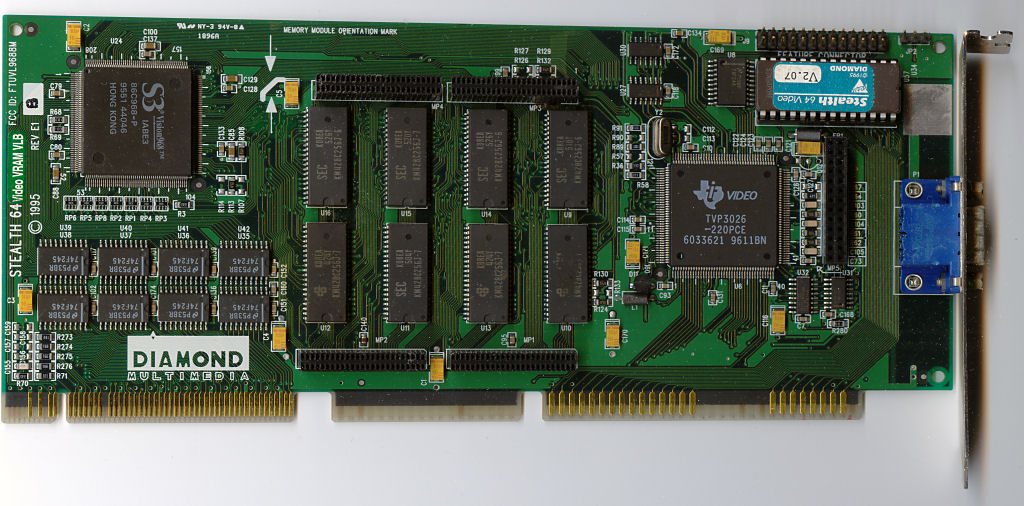
Diamond Stealth64 Video VRAM / Video 3240

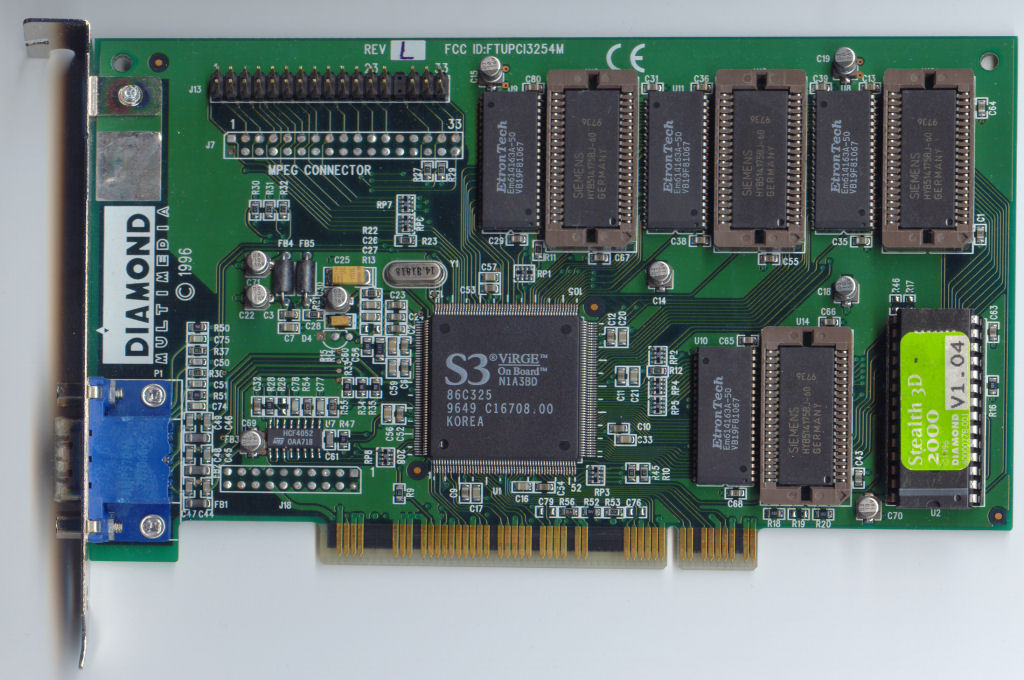
Diamond Stealth 3D 2000

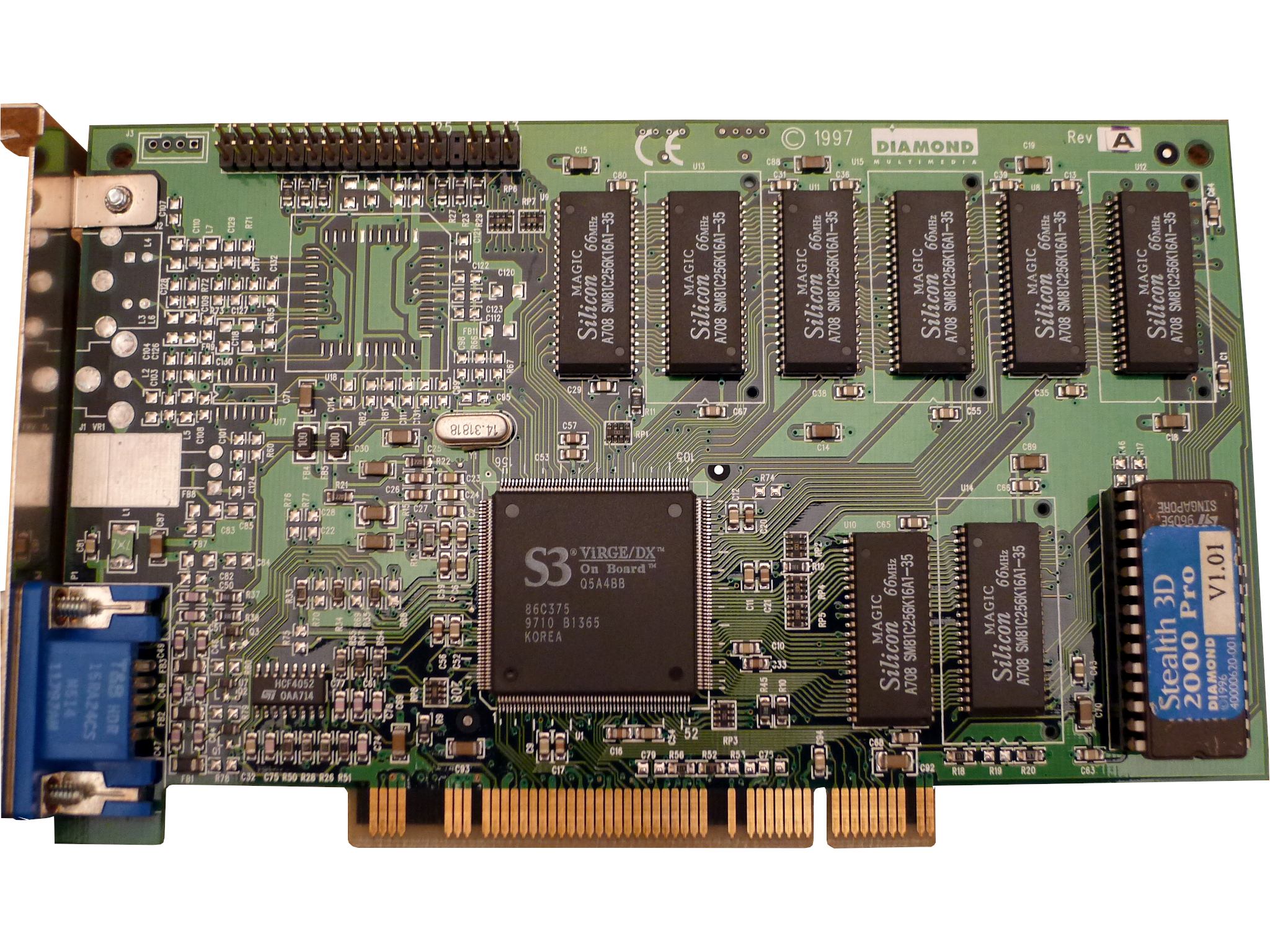
Diamond Stealth 3D 2000 Pro

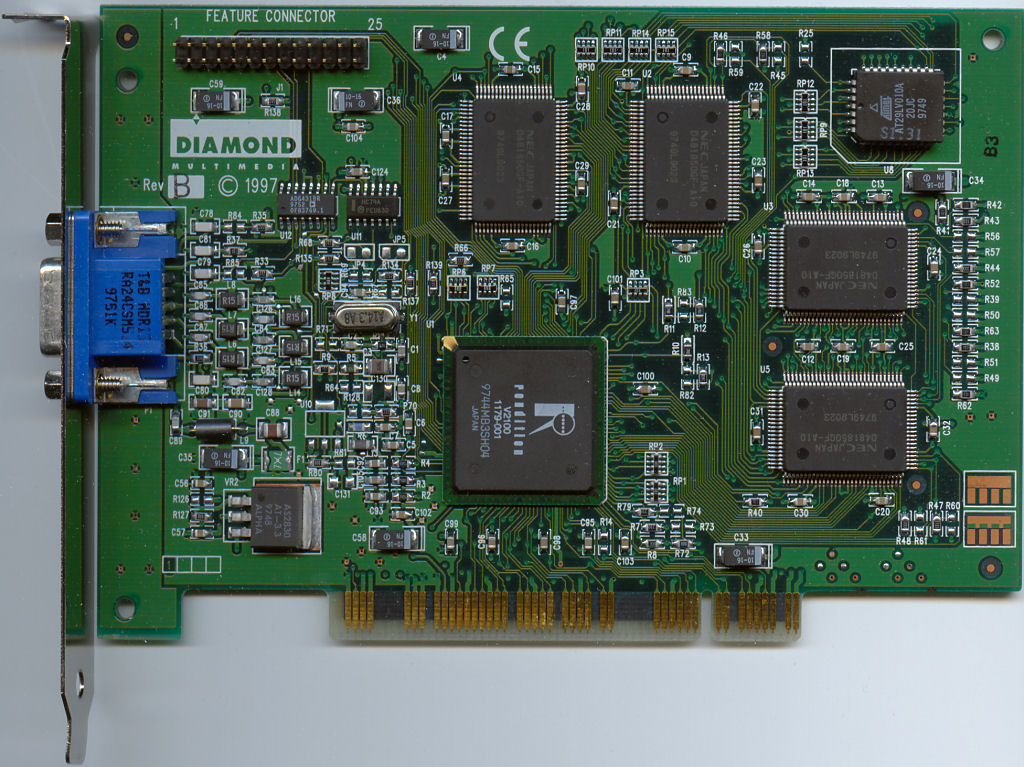
Diamond Stealth II S220

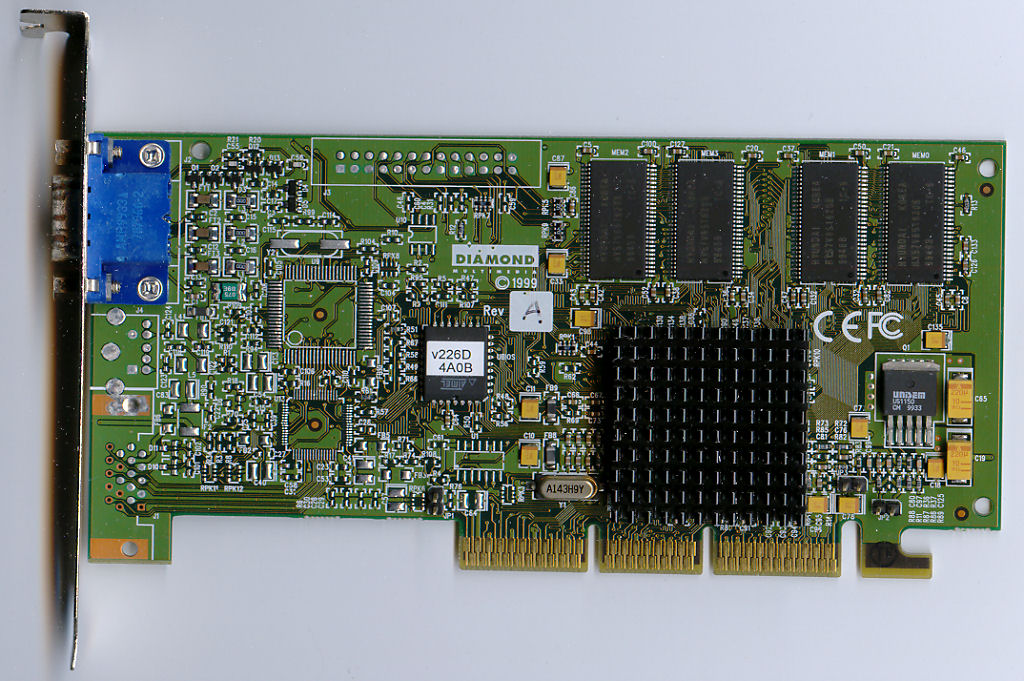
Diamond Stealth III S540 Xtreme

The Stealth cards of the 2D era were first launched in the early 1990s and were usually based on GUI accelerators from S3 Graphics. The line later included chipsets with combined 2D and 3D capabilities. Initially the Stealth line was Diamond's high-end brand but transitioned to midrange after the Viper line was introduced.

Notable members of the Stealth family have been the Diamond Stealth 3D 2000, by far the most popular S3 Virge-based board. The Diamond Stealth32, using the Tseng Labs ET4000/W32p chipset, was capable of impressive price/performance, especially in DOS. The Diamond Stealth64 Graphics 2001, with the ARK 2000PV/MT chipset, was known for excellent DOS performance at the time. The Diamond Stealth II S220, using the Rendition Verite V2100 2D/3D accelerator, was popular with enthusiasts for its excellent price/performance for both 2D and 3D gaming. A special BIOS patch was released by Diamond for the Stealth II S220 which brought its clock speed up to the same level as the high-end Verite V2200 chip, resulting in equal performance at a significantly lower price.

In the middle of the Stealth line-up, Diamond chose to implement a numbering scheme to differentiate their cards. For example, the Diamond Stealth Video VRAM was rechristened the Diamond Stealth Video 3xxx. The numbers had more than a random meaning. Specifically, they tell the buyer the card's memory amount and type. The Stealth Video 3240 uses VRAM (3), is equipped with 2 MB initially (2), and is upgradeable to 4 MB (4). If the first digit was (2), then the card used standard DRAM.

The numbering scheme confused many people since Diamond just renamed current cards with new names. The Stealth Video 3240 was simply the old Stealth Video VRAM. New cards did also use the scheme, however, such as the S3 Trio64V+ cards.

Partial listing of Stealth-branded models

- Diamond Stealth VRAM S3-911/924 ISA
- Diamond Stealth 24 S3-801/805ISA
- Diamond Stealth 24 VLB S3-805VLB
- Diamond Stealth Pro S3-928 ISA/VLB
- Diamond Stealth SE S3-Trio32 VLB/PCI
- Diamond Stealth64 Graphics2001 ARK 2000PV/MT PCI
- Diamond Stealth32 Tseng Labs ET4000/W32p VLB/PCI
- Diamond Stealth64 DRAM S3-864/Trio64 VLB/PCI
- Diamond Stealth64 Video DRAM S3-868 VLB/PCI
- Diamond Stealth64 VRAM S3-964 VLB/PCI
- Diamond Stealth64 Video VRAM S3-968 VLB/PCI
- Diamond Stealth64 Video 2001 S3-Trio64V+ PCI
- Diamond Stealth64 Video 2121 S3-Trio64V+ PCI
- Diamond Stealth64 Video 2201 S3-Trio64V+ PCI
- Diamond Stealth64 Video 2001 TV S3-Trio64V+ PCI
- Diamond Stealth64 Video 2121 TV S3-Trio64V+ PCI
- Diamond Stealth64 Video 2201 TV S3-Trio64V+ PCI
- Diamond Stealth64 Video 2200XL VLB/PCI
- Diamond Stealth64 Video 2120 S3-Trio64 VLB
- Diamond Stealth64 Video 2200 S3-Trio64 VLB
- Diamond Stealth64 Video 2500 ProMotionAT24 PCI
- Diamond Stealth64 Video 3200 S3-Vision968 VLB/PCI
- Diamond Stealth64 Video 3240 S3-Vision968 VLB/PCI
- Diamond Stealth64 Video 3400 S3-Vision968 VLB/PCI
- Diamond Stealth 3D 2000 S3 ViRGE PCI
- Diamond Stealth 3D 2000 Pro S3 ViRGE DX PCI
- Diamond Stealth 3D 3000 S3 ViRGE VX PCI
- Diamond Stealth 3D 4000 S3 ViRGE GX2 AGP
- Diamond Stealth II S220 Rendition Verite V2100 PCI
- Diamond Stealth II G460 Intel i740 AGP
- Diamond Stealth III S500
- Diamond Stealth III S520 S3 Savage 4 LT AGP
- Diamond Stealth III S530 S3 Savage 4 Pro PCI
- Diamond Stealth III S540 S3 Savage4 Pro/Pro+ PCI/AGP
- Diamond Stealth III S540 Xtreme S3 Savage4 Xtreme AGP
- Diamond Stealth S60 ATI Radeon 7000 AGP
- Diamond Stealth Express ATI Radeon X300SE PCI-Express

=== Edge 3D ===
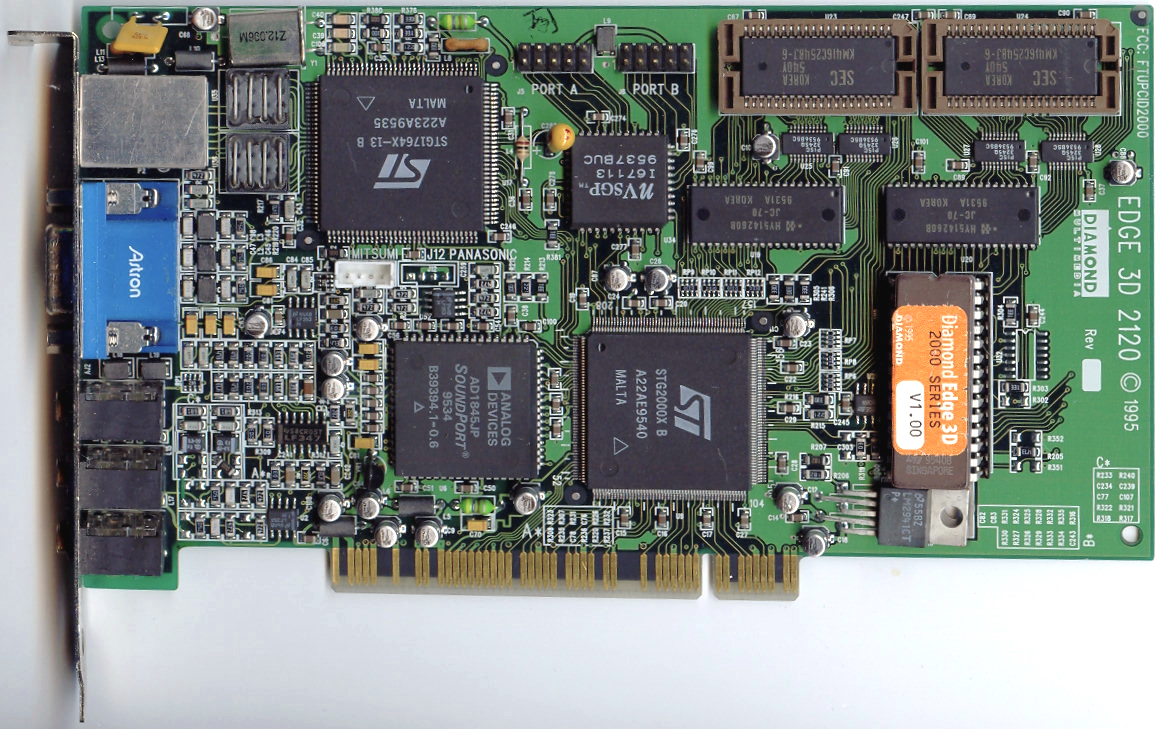
Edge 3D 2120

The Diamond Edge 3D was the first consumer 3D accelerator card, based on the NVIDIA NV1 chipset. The boards were designed to be an all-encompassing entertainment solution, as the chipset and board included full 2D/3D acceleration, an audio engine capable of General MIDI synthesis, and the ability to use Sega Saturn gamepad controllers.

The architecture of the NV1 predates the Microsoft Direct3D philosophy and, as such, game compatibility was a problem with the Diamond Edge boards. Limited and slow Direct3D-supporting drivers did eventually show up, but performance was inadequate and buggy. The audio engine further received poor reviews regarding MIDI quality, which was a common standard for multimedia music playback at the time.

Listing of Edge 3D-branded boards

- Diamond Edge 3D 2xx0 SGS STG2000 (nVidia NV1) PCI
- Diamond Edge 3D 3xx0 nVidia NV1 PCI

=== Monster3D ===
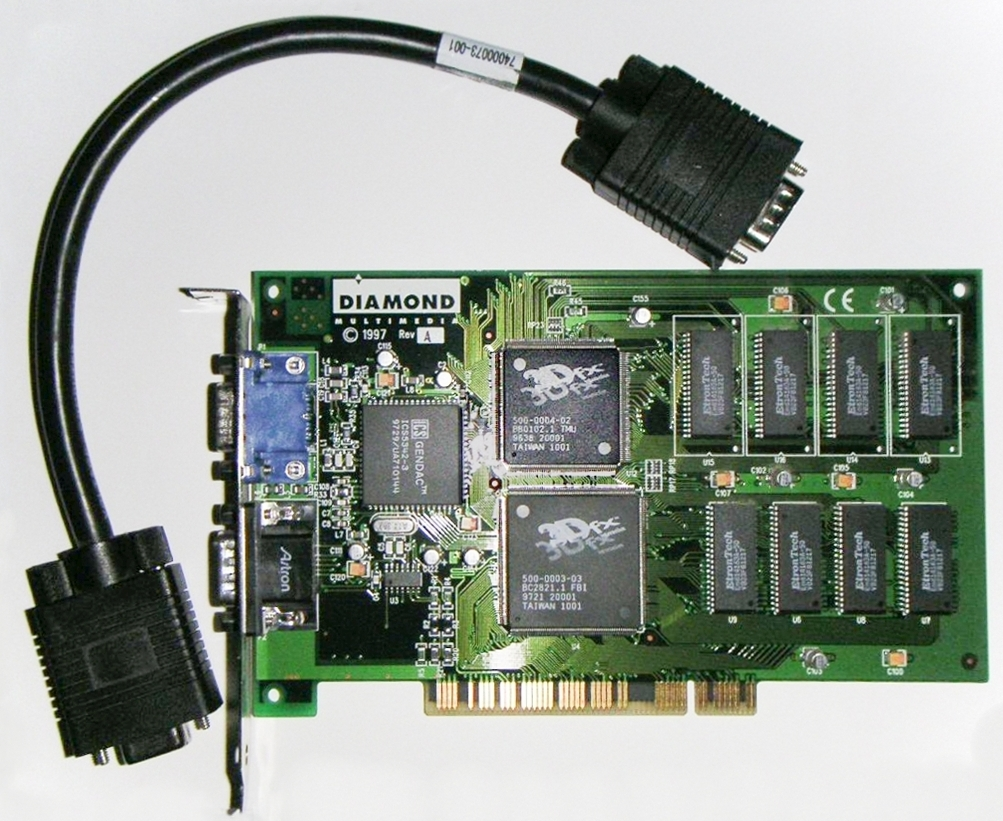
A Diamond Monster 3D 3dfx Voodoo1 and external pass-through 2D video interconnect cable

The Monster3D line was based on 3dfx Voodoo Graphics and Voodoo2 chips which did not possess 2D graphics capabilities, requiring a separate VGA card connected externally using a pass-through cable. When the 3D engine was called into use, the 3dfx-based card would disconnect the 2D pass-through signal and begin driving the display directly. Both Voodoo and Voodoo2 based offerings were in production until the STB-3dfx merger. The series was highly successful as the Voodoo Graphics and Voodoo2 chipsets introduced consumer-grade 3D graphics into the PC and arcade markets, whereas such capabilities had previously been present primarily in very high-end CAD and graphic design workstations.

A critically acclaimed feature of the Monster 3D II (and all other Voodoo2 boards) was the capability to connect two identical boards in a SLI (Scan-Line Interleave) configuration. In SLI, a pair of Voodoo2 boards splits the effort of rendering the 3D scene between alternating raster lines, allowing performance to be nearly doubled.

Listing of Monster 3D-branded boards

- Diamond Monster 3D 3dfx Voodoo1 4 MB PCI
- Diamond Monster 3D II 3dfx Voodoo2 8 MB PCI (4 MB video RAM, 4 MB texture RAM)
- Diamond Monster 3D II 3dfx Voodoo2 12 MB PCI (4 MB video RAM, 8 MB texture RAM)
- Diamond Monster 3D II MEGAMonster bundle (Monster 3D II, MEGAMonster Voodoo2 companion board, MEGAMonster (SLI) cable) (a Voodoo2 SLI bundle offered by Diamond)
- Diamond Monster Fusion Z100 3dfx Voodoo Banshee 16 MB PCI/AGP (Referred to as the "Mon Fusion" by the sticker on many cards)

=== Viper ===
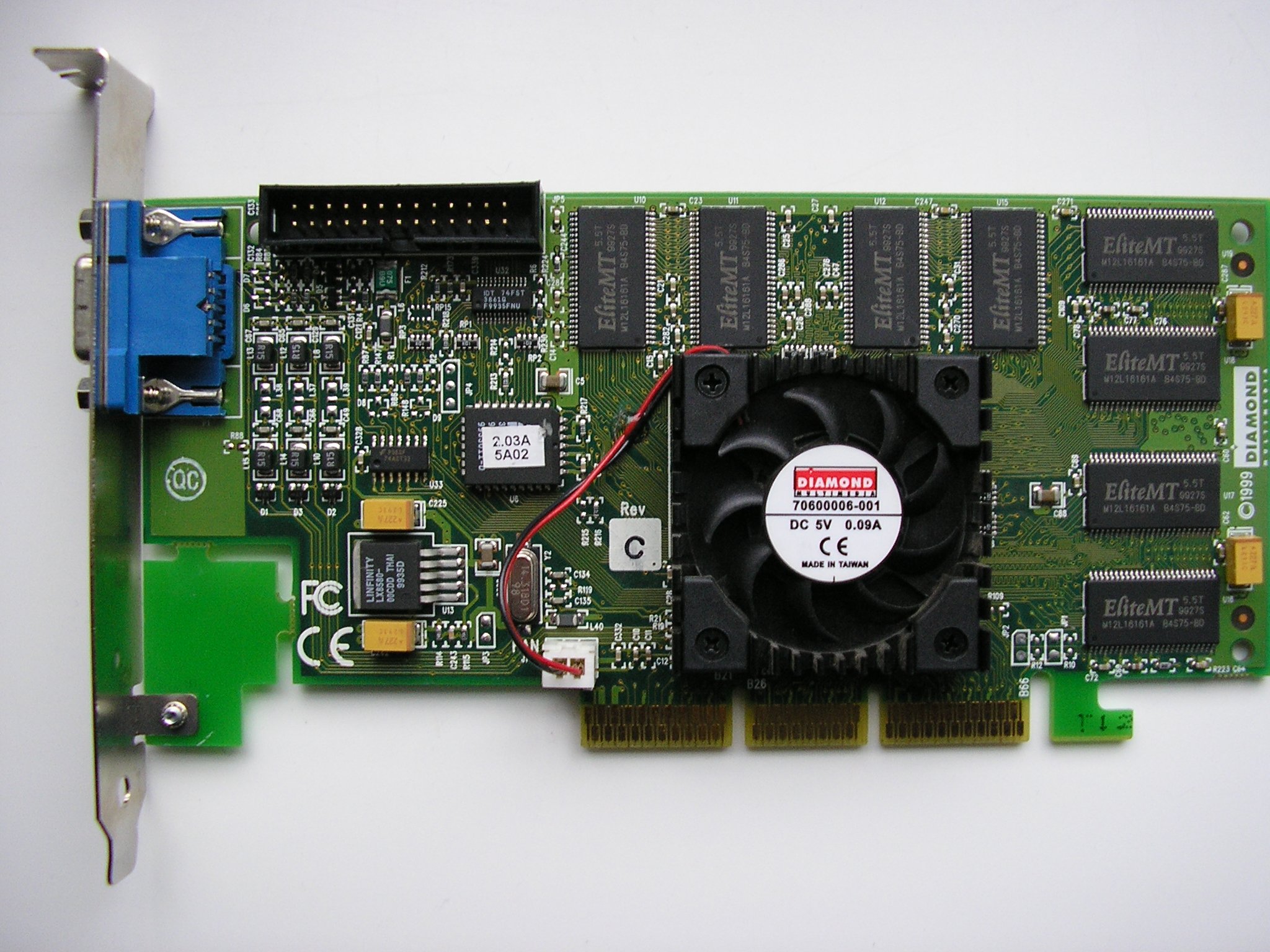
Viper V770 Ultra - Diamond's flagship before the S3 merger

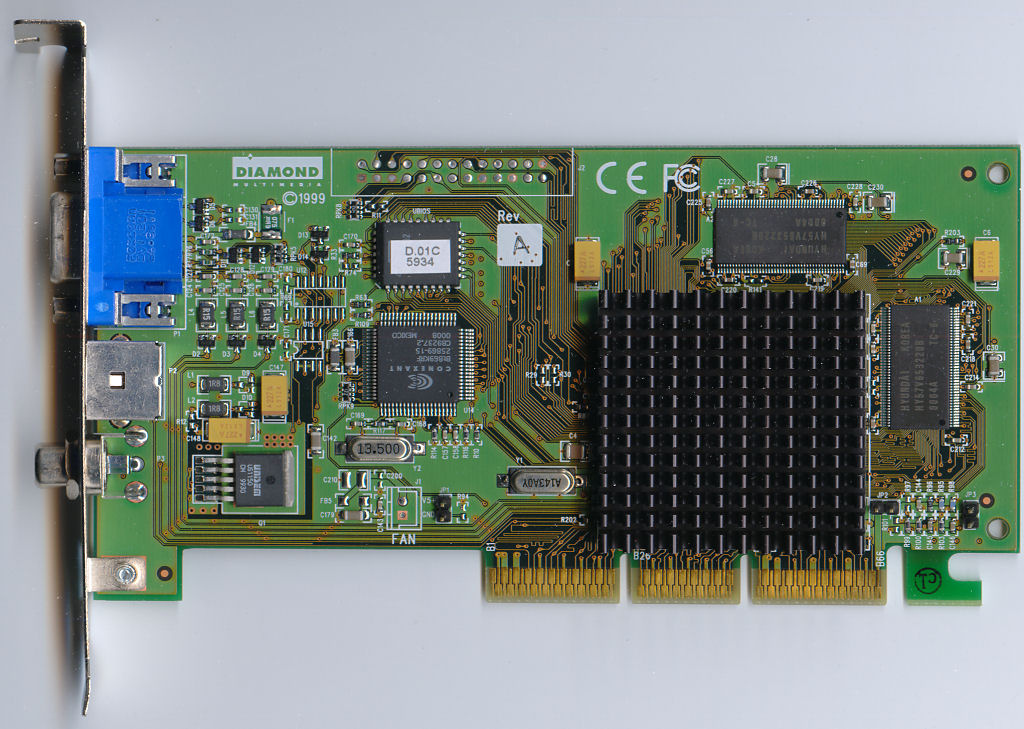
Viper II Z200 - S3/Diamond's flagship before the VIA merger

The Viper line was Diamond's high-end offering. Initially it consisted of a graphics accelerator board for VLB or PCI that was a combination of two graphics chips. For non-GUI environments such as DOS, the original Viper used an Oak Technology OTI-087 display chip with its own 256 KB DRAM. This chip was rather slow and basic. The Viper SE card moved to a Weitek 5186 chip with 1 MB DRAM for non-GUI functions. For GUI environments such as Windows, the Viper cards used a Weitek graphics co-processor which accelerated many drawing functions and performed very well for its time. The original Viper used the Weitek P9000/P9001, while the Viper SE used a Weitek P9100, both lines equipped with 2-4 MB VRAM. The separate slow DOS chip was a problem for owners who played DOS games because these chips were quite slow and had limited and buggy VESA BIOS Extensions implementations. While the GUI accelerator was very capable, drivers from Diamond were rather buggy and were only revised a few times during the lifetime of the card.

Towards the end of the 1990s, the Viper line consisted of NVIDIA-based graphics cards. The Diamond Viper V330 used the highly integrated RIVA 128 accelerator that featured very capable 2D, 3D and video acceleration. The later Diamond Viper V550 and V770 utilized the RIVA TNT and RIVA TNT2 accelerators which were evolutions of the RIVA 128. The Viper V730 was a cost-reduced version based on the NVIDIA Vanta chip and was commonly used in OEM computers, including systems from Compaq.

In 1999, Diamond was acquired by S3 Graphics and became primarily a supplier of products based upon their graphics accelerator chips. The Diamond Viper II Z200 was based upon the S3 Savage 2000, a supposed NVIDIA GeForce 256 killer. The chip itself was not fully functional and the drivers were very buggy.

Partial listing of Viper-branded boards

- Diamond Viper Weitek P9000 VLB/PCI (Released 1993)
- Diamond Viper SE Weitek P9100 VLB/PCI
- Diamond Viper PCI Weitek P9100 PCI
- Diamond Viper Pro Video Weitek P9100 VLB/PCI
- Diamond Viper V330 nVidia Riva 128 PCI
- Diamond Viper V550 nVidia Riva TNT AGP/PCI
- Diamond Viper V730 nVidia Vanta AGP
- Diamond Viper V770 nVidia Riva TNT2 AGP
- Diamond Viper V770 Ultra nVidia Riva TNT2 Ultra AGP
- Diamond Viper II Z200 S3 Savage 2000 AGP
- Diamond Viper ATI Radeon X600PRO PCI-Express
- Diamond Viper ATI Radeon X1300 PCI-Express
- Diamond Viper ATI Radeon X1800 PCI-Express

=== FireGL ===
The name "FireGL" stands for Diamond's workstation-class 2D/3D graphics cards. This brand was originally created decades ago as just "Fire" by the design team of the professional computer graphics pioneer SPEA Software AG from Starnberg (Germany) that was acquired by Diamond in 1995.

Products whilst under the hood of Diamond were:

- Diamond Fire GL, based on the 3Dlabs GLINT 300SX and S3 Vision968 (for 2D) chips, PCI interface
- Diamond Fire GL 1000, based on the 3Dlabs Permedia NT (Permedia + GLINT Delta) chips, PCI interface
- Diamond Fire GL 2000, based on the 3Dlabs GLINT 300SX, GLINT Delta and Avance Logic ALG2564 (for 2D) chips, PCI interface
- Diamond Fire GL 3000, based on the 3Dlabs GLINT 500TX, GLINT Delta and Avance Logic ALG2564 (for 2D) chips, PCI interface
- Diamond Fire GL 4000, based on the Mitsubishi 3DPro/2mp chipset and Cirrus Logic CL-GD5446 (for 2D) chip, PCI interface
- Diamond Fire GL 1000 Pro, based on 3Dlabs Permedia2 chip, PCI/AGP interface

The FireGL team was bought by ATI (later AMD) in 2001 once the combined Diamond/S3 dropped out of the graphics market to form SONICblue. ATI continues the Fire GL lineup.

As of September 2007, thus long after that business, Diamond was also preparing a new video card, based on the latest-generation R600 graphics core. This was the same core as used for ATI driven FireGL V8650 and V8600 cards. Diamond altered the PCB reference design and labeled their device VFX 2000 series professional workstation graphics card. It came with at least 2 GB GDDR4 memory on board.

=== Radeon HD ===
Partial listing of Radeon HD branded models

- Radeon HD 3650 1GB GDDR2 PCI Express
- Radeon HD 4870 X2
- Radeon HD 6770 XOC

== Sound cards ==
=== Monster Sound ===
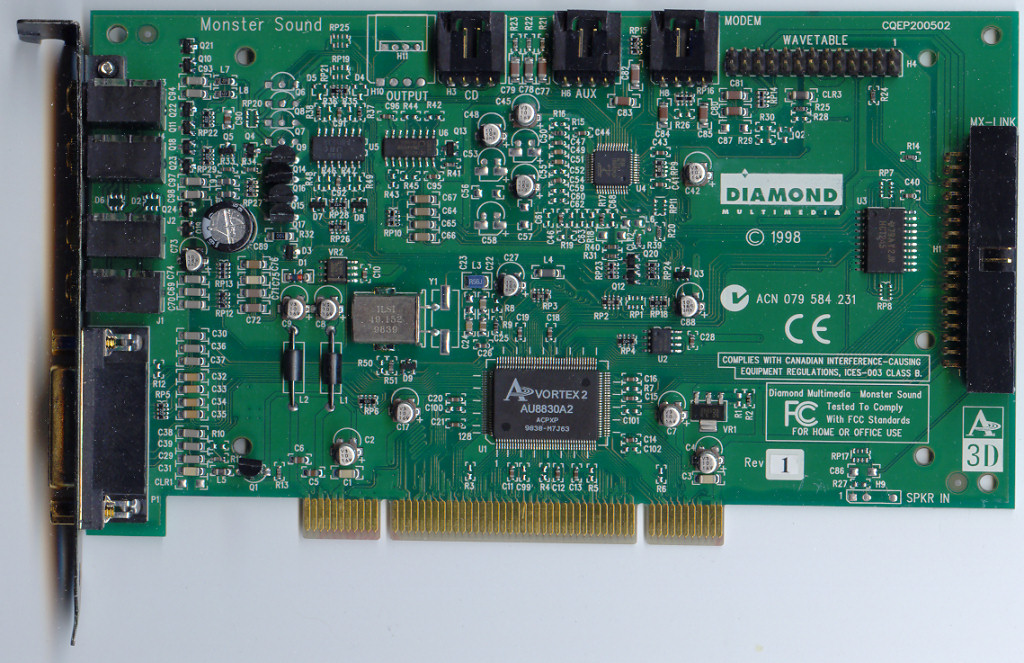
Diamond Monster Sound MX300

The Diamond Monster Sound gaming sound card series was the first sound card to have its own on-board processor to handle audio operations. The Monster Sound cards were the first to support hardware mixing acceleration with Microsoft's new DirectSound and DirectSound3D audio APIs. Most, if not all, also supported Aureal's burgeoning A3D API.

The original Monster Sound card was distinct in this regard, but also controversial because it possessed poor DOS game compatibility which was still critical at the time. DOS game audio was only functional within a Windows 95 DOS box. It came equipped with a 2 MB AdMOS MIDI daughterboard.

The Monster Sound M80 was similar to the original Monster Sound, but lacked 4 speaker support. It also had a reduced quality AdMOS MIDI daughterboard (1MB).

Monster Sound MX200 had excellent General MIDI quality because of the high quality patch set (licensed from Roland) it was equipped with on its 4MB Dream daughtercard. Otherwise it was technically identical to the original Monster Sound.

The Diamond Monster Sound MX300 was based on the Vortex2 audio ASIC from Aureal Semiconductor. It was a substantial step forward in gaming audio, with impressive 3D audio positioning and other effects. It utilized the then state-of-the-art Aureal A3D 2.0 3D audio API.

Monster Sound MX400 was advertised as being one of the first sound cards with hardware MP3 decoding acceleration. This was a redundant feature because the central CPUs in PCs at the time were more than capable of handling MP3 playback. It was also somewhat complicated to make use of the MP3 acceleration because special software was needed to use it.

The Vortex2-equipped MX300 was a superior card for 3D audio. Aureal had gone into bankruptcy and was dissolved, so their last generation of chips were never released. Diamond instead used ESS's less powerful chips to continue the line. The MX400 was the last of the Monster Sound cards.

- Diamond Monster Sound PCI
- Diamond Monster Sound M80 PCI
- Diamond Monster Sound MX100 PCI
- Diamond Monster Sound MX200 PCI
- Diamond Monster Sound MX300 Aureal Vortex2 PCI
- Diamond Monster Sound MX400 ESS Canyon3D PCI

=== Sonic Impact ===
The Sonic Impact was the value-oriented sound card line from Diamond. Whereas the MonsterSound lineup was targeted at no-holds-barred gamers, the Sonic Impact cards were more generally aimed, and were cheaper and less powerful. Still the lineup consisted of several capable cards.

- Diamond Sonic Impact S70 ESS Maestro2 PCI
- Diamond Sonic Impact S90(A/B) Aureal Vortex1 PCI
- Diamond Sonic Impact S100 ESS Allegro PCI

=== XtremeSound ===
Diamond XtremeSound is the first sound card line launched after the company's restructuring in 2003.

- Diamond XtremeSound - 5.1/16 bit Sound Card (XS51) C-Media CMI8738-LX PCI
- Diamond XtremeSound - 7.1/24 bit Sound Card (XS71) C-Media CMI8768 PCI
- Diamond XtremeSound - 7.1/24 bit Sound Card with Dolby Digital Live (XS71DDL) C-Media CMI8768+ PCI

=== Other Sound Cards ===
- Diamond Sonic Pro (ISA)
- Diamond Mozart (ISA)
- Diamond Sonic Sound (ISA)
- Diamond Sonic Sound LX (ISA)
- Diamond Sonic 3D (ISA)

== Other products ==
=== TrackSTAR ===
Diamond's first product (under the corporate name Diamond Computer Systems) was the TrackSTAR, an 8-bit ISA plug-in card for the IBM PC that emulated an Apple II. An early advertisement from 1984 also claimed it would add CP/M compatibility via the included Zilog Z80 processor. The TrackSTAR was redesigned to fit in the shorter expansion slot of the Tandy 1000 and was key to that marque's expansion into the educational computer market.

=== Rio PMP300 ===
Diamond's innovation created the Rio PMP300, one of the first consumer MP3 players, but they soon sold their MP3 player line and no longer provide support for it.

=== SupraMax DSL modems ===
The SupraMax line is a popular value DSL modem line. The brand has a lineage going back to Supra, Inc.

=== Diamond Micronics motherboards ===
Diamond began manufacturing PC-compatible motherboards after purchasing Micronics Computers in 1998.

=== Maximum DVD ===
Diamond was an early (1997) entrant into PC DVD kits with their Maximum DVD 1000DB-VAR (Value Added Reseller) and 2000-RETKIT (RETail KIT). These kits bundled a 'feature reduced' (several pin headers and other parts not installed) full length PCI MPEG2 analog overlay decoder card made by division. This card connected to the VGA card with an external passthrough cable, a 3.5 mm (1/8 in) external patch cord to the soundcard's line-in jack, and the analog audio cable from the included Toshiba SD-M1002 DVD-ROM drive connected to the division card while a second cable passed the audio on to the soundcard's internal connector.

Diamond also made kits called the Maximum DVD 1500 and 2500. (Hardware specifications unknown.) The drivers and player software for these are not compatible with the DVD 1000 and 2000. They are a slightly newer product with the 'Navigator' player software having a cleaner user interface.

None of these DVD kits are DirectX compatible and as the drivers are the VxD type, they will only work with Windows 95 through 98SE. Dual-layer DVDs are not supported in original Windows 95 or 95a, but are in the various versions of 95 OEM Service Release 2. Windows 98 or 98SE is not recommended due to problems that may happen with video color and alignment. Only the bundled player software can use the hardware MPEG2 decoding of the card.

=== SCSI adapters ===
Diamond produced the capable but relatively low-cost FirePort 40 SCSI adapter in the late 1990s.

== Additional sources ==
1. Data Products Completes Acquisition of Diamond Multimedia Brands and Asset" by Best Data Products Inc., October 28, 2003, retrieved December 23, 2005
2. "PC Video Chipset Information" by Michael Scott & Harm Hanemaayer, February 19, 1997, retrieved December 23, 2005
3. "Wave Issue 9825 5/13/98 Article 1-01" by 4th Wave Inc., May 13, 1998, retrieved January 13, 2005
