= STB Systems =

Defunct graphics hardware company

STB Systems, Inc.
- Type: Public
- Industry: Computer
- Founded: 1981; 45 years ago in Richardson, Texas
- Founders: Don Balthaser; Bill Ogle; Mark Sims
- Defunct: May 1999; 27 years ago
- Fate: Acquired by 3dfx Interactive
- Number of employees: 895 (1996, peak)
- Website: stb.com at the Wayback Machine (archived June 7, 1997)

STB Systems, Inc., was an American graphics adapter card manufacturer active from 1981 to 1999. Initially a manufacturer of various expansion cards for the Apple II, the company quickly leaned into the graphics accelerator market for IBM PCs and compatibles, owing to the IBM PC's more open architecture. STB went public in 1995 and was once the second-largest global vendor of multimedia computer products. In 1999, the company was acquired by 3dfx Interactive.

== History ==
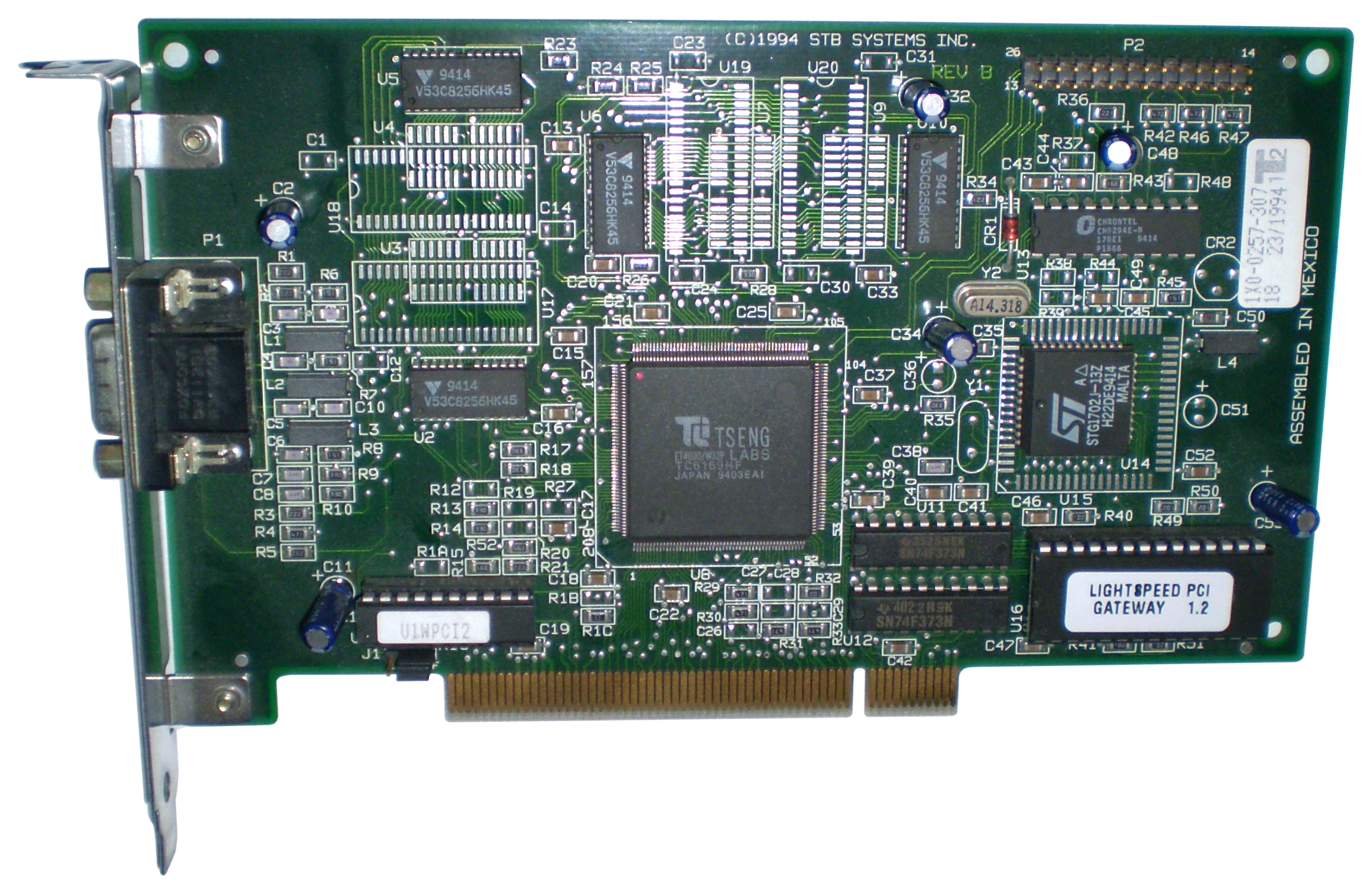
An STB LightSpeed graphics card from 1994, making use of a Tseng Labs ET4000 chip

STB Systems, Inc., was founded in Richardson, Texas, in 1981 by Don Balthaser, Bill Ogle, and Mark Sims. Ogle, its chief founder, was chief executive officer and chairman since the company's foundation; he previously worked for Texas Instruments as an engineer. The founders eschewed raising venture capital with the founding of STB, instead borrowing $10,000 from Plano Bank & Trust as their startup capital. The company was named STB, an abbreviation of its slogan "Simply the Best".

STB's first products were released in 1981 and comprised memory expansion boards and graphics enhancement cards for the Apple II. The trio found themselves restricted by Apple's apprehension toward clonemakers and heavy use of patented hardware and copyrighted software in the design and functionality of the Apple II family. Apple erstwhile had been losing market share to IBM's Personal Computer, clones of which had been propagating wildly after only a year on the market. Such clones could accept expansion cards marketed for the IBM PC proper, leading to a lucrative market for IBM PC peripheral vendors. Recognizing this, in 1983, STB began offering products for the IBM PC, starting with the Super RIO—a multifunction board expanding the PC's RAM by up to 384 KB as well as adding a real-time clock and parallel and serial ports—in mid-1983. In late November 1983, they introduced the Graphix Plus, their first graphics accelerator board for the IBM PC.

After steady growth in the 1980s, STB expanded their presence internationally in the next decade. In the early 1990s the company bought out an 80,000-square-foot factory in Juárez, Mexico, for the manufacture of their graphics cards. By the mid-1990s the factory was able to produce 200,000 cards in a single month. STB also used the factory to take contract work for other expansion card vendors needing their own PCBs. By January 1996, STB employed roughly 815 workers: 153 in the United States, 12 in the company's three European offices (in London, Frankfurt and Paris), and about 650 in Juárez.

In 1994, STB entered the growing 3D acceleration graphics card market with the introduction of the Power 3D System board, making use of 3Dlabs's Glint chip. The card saw heavy adoption among engineers working with CAD/CAM software, earning the company a devoted following. STB meanwhile gained several computer systems manufacturers as reseller of STB's video card products, as bundled with prebuilt machines, in the mid-1990s. These vendors included IBM, Gateway 2000, Acer, Hewlett-Packard, and Dell, among others. In February 1995, STB filed its initial public offering. Its stock price fluctuated rapidly after multiple chip shortages were announced in the year, but the company's revenue grew to $129.6 million for fiscal year 1995, up from $89.8 million in 1994. By 1997, the company was the second-largest dedicated vendor of multimedia computer products.

In February 1997, the company opened up a software development house in Belfast, Northern Ireland, focusing on the development of device drivers and performance-enhancing utilities for games designed for Windows. STB planned to hire 40 workers there by 2000. In April 1997, the company acquired Symmetric Simulation Systems, a manufacturer of high-end 3D accelerator cards marketed to CAD/CAM users and multimedia CD-ROM authors based in Dallas, Texas, for $1,000,000. In August 1997, the company announced the opening of a 150,000-square-foot office at Synergy Park North in the University of Texas at Dallas.

3dfx Interactive, a graphics chip maker, announced the acquisition of STB Systems in December 1998, in a stock swap valuated at $141 million. Previously only a maker of the graphics chips that go onto video cards, such as those STB made, 3dfx's acquisition of STB allowed the former to manufacture complete graphics cards for the first time, putting it in the difficult position of having to compete with former business partners, such as Creative Labs and Diamond Multimedia, who used 3dfx's chips in their graphics cards. 3dfx's acquisition of STB was completed in the tail end of May 1999.

Following the merger, conditions at 3dfx deteriorated rapidly, and the company's intellectual property was acquired by their largest competitor Nvidia in 2000, 3dfx properly dissolving in 2002. Industry analysts considered their acquisition of STB a major reason behind 3dfx's decline, as it resulted in third-party manufacturers transforming from investors in the development of 3dfx's products (a significant source of revenue) into competitors; these companies in turn began purchasing from Nvidia for their 3D accelerator chips.

== See also ==
- Voodoo3, the first product jointly manufactured by STB Systems and 3dfx
