= Chong Moon Lee =

American entrepreneur

- 이종문
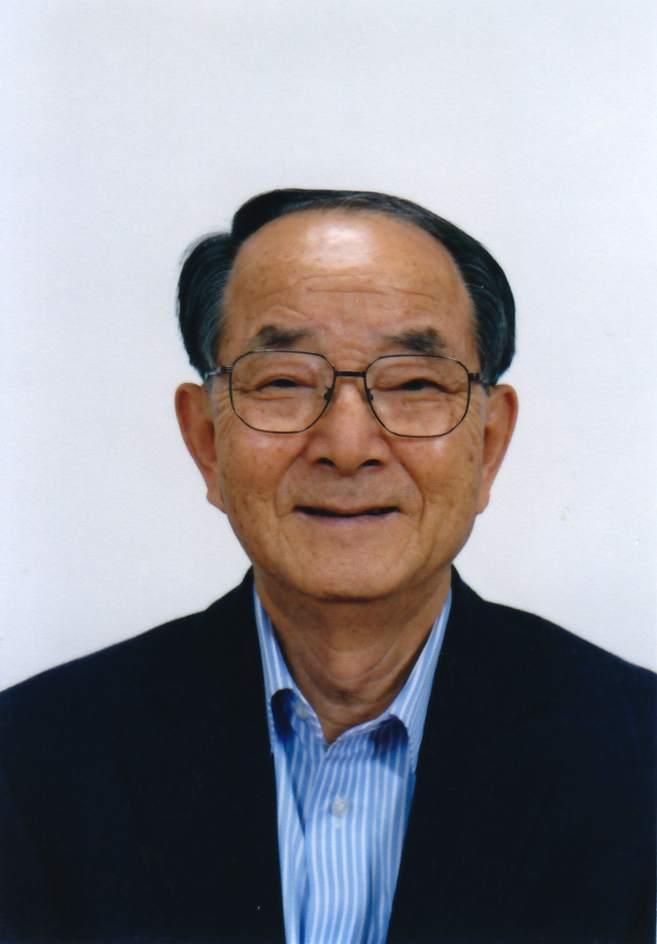
- Born: August 1, 1928 (age 98); Dangjin, Korea
- Education: Graduate; MS degree
- Alma mater: Chung-Ang University; Vanderbilt University
- Notable work: Diamond Multimedia, founder and CEO emeritus

Chong Moon Lee (Korean: 이종문, born 1928) is an American entrepreneur and philanthropist. He founded Diamond Multimedia in 1982; after stepping down from Diamond, he founded AmBex Venture Partners in 1996.

== Early life ==
Lee was born in Dangjin, near Seoul, on August 1, 1928, to a father who traded Chinese herbal medicine. He was the youngest of five children. Leaving school at 12 because his family could not afford the fees, Lee spent his "teenage years repairing fishing boats, mixing and slicing Chinese herbs and cleaning a pawnshop." Lee claims to be descended from King Sejong the Great.

== Career ==
During the Korean War, Lee worked as a translator for the United States Army. He also started working for his family's pharmaceutical business, Chong Kun Dang, in 1955. Chong Kun Dang was founded by his older brother, Chong-Kun Lee, in 1941. Despite working full-time, he was able to study and sit for the national college entrance exam, earning a place in university. He graduated from the law school at Chung-Ang University in 1953 with an LLB degree and later won a Korean government-sponsored scholarship for graduate studies in library science at Vanderbilt University, receiving a MS degree in 1959.

After returning from his studies in the United States, Lee resumed work at Chong Kun Dang. He also served the Third Republic of Korea as a translator, starting in 1965. He emigrated to the US in 1970, shortly after a forced constitutional amendment allowed South Korean President Park Chung Hee to run for a third term; after arriving in America, Lee ran an export business, selling golf balls and other closeout items to Japan. He brought his wife and children to America six months later.

=== Diamond Multimedia ===
Starting in 1977, Lee served as a consultant to technology companies to help them market and export to Asian countries. He purchased two personal computers for his children: an Apple II in 1979 and then an IBM PC in 1982; however, he soon found that his son, for whom he had purchased the PC, was often using his sister's Apple instead because there were more educational games for the Apple. He founded Diamond Computer Systems in 1982 with the goal of creating an emulation card that would allow the IBM to run Apple software, but initially was not successful.

An engineer convinced him the card, eventually released as the TrackSTAR, could be developed and marketed within six months, but it took six and a half years as the copyright issues were difficult to overcome. The company lost millions and Lee suffered personal setbacks including losing his home and marriage, leading him to contemplate suicide while pointing a gun to his head. The original TrackSTAR was advertised in 1984 with both Apple and CP/M compatibility; it was later redesigned to fit in Tandy 1000 personal computers and released in January 1986.

Lee would later shift the focus of his company to multimedia in 1988, at Tandy's suggestion. An engineer at his company, Hyung Hwe Huh, developed a graphics accelerator that won over Gateway, a new client that would mark the start of a rapid expansion. Diamond was ranked the 17th fastest growing private company in the US in 1993 and had a public offering in 1995. PC Magazine named Lee the innovator of the year in 1999 for the first mass-marketed MP3 player, the Diamond Rio PMP300.

=== AmBex Venture Partners ===
In January 1995, Lee sold a majority stake in Diamond to Summitt Associates; with part of the $92 million he received, he started a venture capital firm named AmBex Venture Partners. He started the Asia-Pacific Information Technology Summit in 1997 to bring senior Asian and American businesspeople and officials together.

== Personal life ==
Lee lives in Portola Valley with his second wife, Reiko.

== Philanthropy ==
Lee contributed $15 million in 1995 to the Asian Art Museum of San Francisco, seeding a relocation campaign that resulted in moving the museum from a space shared with the de Young Museum in Golden Gate Park to the former Main Library building in Civic Center.

== Awards and honorary degrees ==
- John F. Kennedy University: PhD, Economics (1996)
- University of Seoul: PhD, Engineering (1998)
- Order of Civil Merit, 1st Grade (1999)
- Seton Hall University: PhD, Philosophy (2001)
- Chung-Ang University: PhD, Business Management (2005)
- Korea Advanced Institute of Science and Technology: PhD, Engineering (2007)
