= ARK Logic =

Defunct American graphics hardware company

ARK Logic, Inc.
- Type: Private
- Founded: 1993; 33 years ago in Santa Clara, California, United States
- Founders: Ray Lu; Lewis Eggebrecht
- Defunct: 2002; 24 years ago
- Fate: Dissolution
- Headquarters: San Jose, California (1995–2002)
- Products: Computer graphics hardware
- Owner: Integrated Circuit Systems (1995–1997, 51%)
- Parent: Vision 2000 Ventures (1997–2002)
- Website: arklogic.com at the Wayback Machine (archived 2002-09-14)

ARK Logic, Inc., simply known as ARK (an abbreviation of Advanced Rendering Kernels), was an American computer graphics hardware company active from 1993 to 2002 and based in San Jose, California. The company designed a number of 2D graphics processing units (GPUs), largely PCI-based, that saw moderate use in aftermarket graphics cards for personal computers in the 1990s.

== History ==
=== Foundation (1993–1995) ===
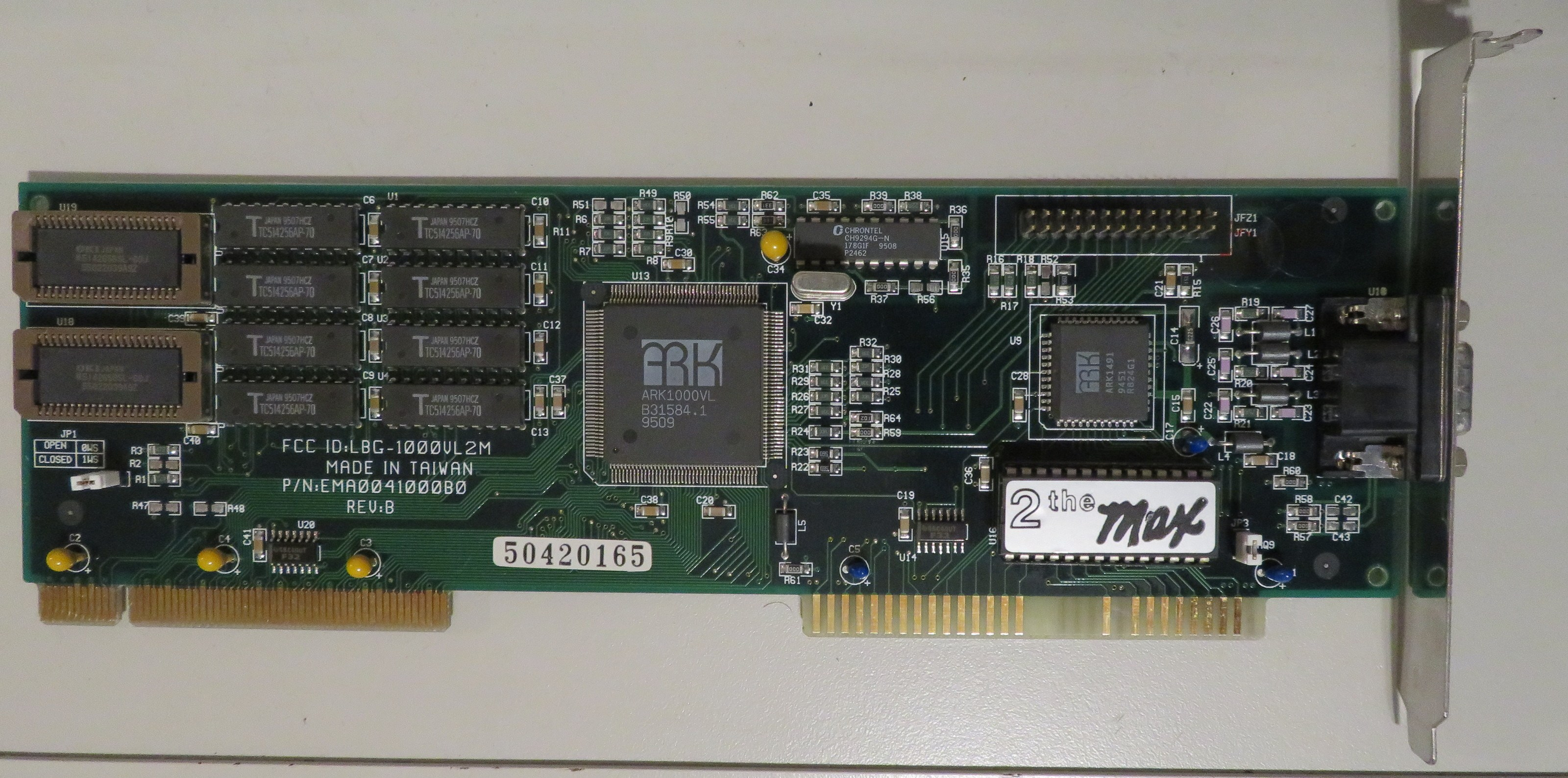
2the Max's Premier 1000 VLB graphics card, featuring ARK's 32-bit ARK1000PV GPU

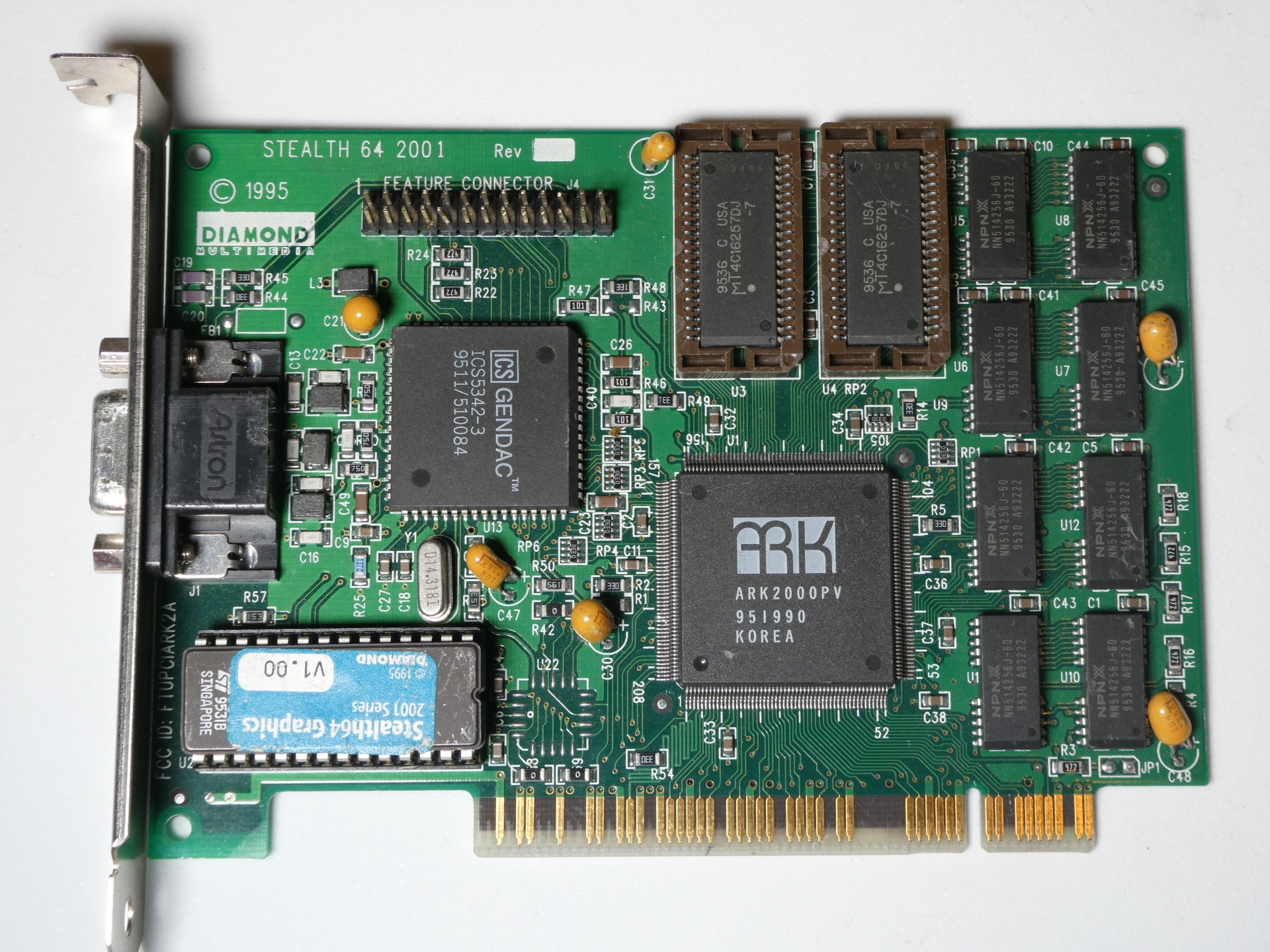
Diamond Multimedia's Stealth64 PCI graphics card, featuring ARK's 64-bit ARK2000PV GPU

ARK Logic was principally founded by Ruey "Ray" Lu in 1993 in Santa Clara, California. Lewis Eggebrecht, the chief designer of the IBM Personal Computer, was hired as the chief scientific officer of ARK.

The company released its first products to the market in October 1994, comprising a pair of GUI accelerators designed in-house by ARK. They were the ARK1000PV and the ARK2000PV, the former a 32-bit GUI accelerator and the latter a 64-bit GUI accelerator. Both used DRAM and a host interface unit compatible with both Peripheral Component Interconnect (PCI) and VESA Local Bus (VLB). The host interface unit also contains built-in intelligent cache to achieve sustained burst transactions over the PCI bus and zero-wait-state transactions over both PCI and VLB. ARK's first design win was with Western Digital's Paradise subsidiary, which chose the 32-bit ARK1000PV for its low-cost Bali 32 graphics accelerator card in November 1994.

=== Purchase by Integrated Circuit Systems (1995–1997) ===
Integrated Circuit Systems (ICS), a manufacturer of clock generators and RAMDACs based in Valley Forge, Pennsylvania, announced in April 1995 that it had acquired a majority stake (51 percent) in ARK Logic for $7.3 million. The terms of the purchase allowed ICS to acquire the remaining 49 percent stake from the minority interests after 18 months based on fair market value. Following the purchase, ARK Logic moved their headquarters from Santa Clara to San Jose, California. ICS' stake in ARK came two years after they had bought a majority stake in Turtle Beach Corporation, makers of sound cards and other audio peripherals for personal computers. The purchase of both Turtle Beach and ARK solidified ICS' pivot to multimedia products in the mid-1990s, although this ultimately proved short-lived.

ARK earned their second design win with Hercules Computer Technology, who used ARK's 64-bit ARK2000PV to power their Stingray 64 graphics card. In August 1995, ARK scored another design win with Diamond Multimedia, providing the latter with the ARK2000PV graphics accelerator, which powered Diamond's popular Stealth64 graphics card. In December 1995, ARK introduced its followup to the ARK2000PV, the ARK2000MI, which made use of an ICS RAMDAC and included an MPEG-1 decoder chip for full-screen video acceleration.

In August 1996, ARK introduced the ARK2000MT, which replaced the generic RAMDAC with ICS' ICS5342 "GENDAC" (combination clock generator and RAMDAC) and upgraded the full-screen video accelerator chip to one that could decode MPEG-2 video at 30 frames per second. The chip supported displaying at a maximum resolution of 1600 by 1200 pixels at 16.7 million colors. The ARK2000MT made use in Hercules' updated Stingray 64 released that year. The ARK2000MI+, branded as the Quadro64 and released in May 1996, introduced the ARK Peripheral Expansion Bus (APEX), an semi-proprietary internal bus based on VESA's Video Module Interface proposal that allowed the chip to be used beyond strictly outputting computer graphics; for example, given the right ADC, the Quadro64 could be converted into a TV tuner. Eggebrecht explored designing a media processor—a burgeoning class of DSP that aimed to integrate all multimedia functions into one monolithic IC—but he ultimately decided on a traditional parallelized approach with APEX.

=== Sale to Vision 2000 (1997–2002) ===
Sales in ARK Logic's chips slowed down significantly at the end of 1996. Besides a reference design board for a Quadro64-based TV tuner called the Quadro64TV announced in January 1997, the company released no new products that year. On January 13, 1997, Lu stepped down as CEO and president of ARK Logic, being replaced by Allan Havemose while remaining COO. In July 1997, ICS sold off 80 percent of its stake in ARK Logic to Vision 2000 Ventures, a holding company based in the Cayman Islands, relieving the company of $2.3 million of debt. Shortly after, ICS sold off Turtle Beach and relinquished its remaining minority stake in ARK. According to the ICS president Stav Prodromou, the acquisitions of ARK and Turtle Beach were "not well advised and were so far afield from what we do best they ended up hurting the company".

In May 1998, ARK Logic announced the Tiger 3D, its first 3D accelerator chip. It included up to 8 MB of video memory, 4 MB of texture memory, a 250 MHz RAMDAC, a 24-bit Z-buffer, and an 8-bit stencil buffer. The company earned manufacturing commitments from TSMC and LG Semicon to produce the Tiger 3D. In February 1999, the company attempted to re-enter the 3D accelerator market with the Ark 8800 Cougar 3D, with its performance compared to Intel's i740 and ATI's 3D Rage Pro. Industry analysts placed serious doubts on ARK's ability to compete in the 3D marketplace, as those aforementioned chips were rapidly aging at the time of the Cougar 3D's announcement; in addition, the i740 was a commercial flop, with Intel forced to dump them on the market at steep markdowns.

ARK Logic's website went dark in September 2002. Despite the company's GPUs languishing in obscurity, X.Org Foundation still maintains 2D graphics drivers for ARK GPUs for X.Org Server as of February 2023.
