= Tseng Labs =

Computer graphics chip maker

Tseng Laboratories, Inc.
- Industry: Electronics
- Founded: 1983; 43 years ago
- Founder: Jack Hsiao Nan Tseng
- Defunct: 1998
- Fate: Merged with Cell Pathways
- Headquarters: Newtown, Pennsylvania, United States
- Website: tseng.com at the Wayback Machine (archived 1998-07-03)

Sampling of Tseng Labs PC expansion cards

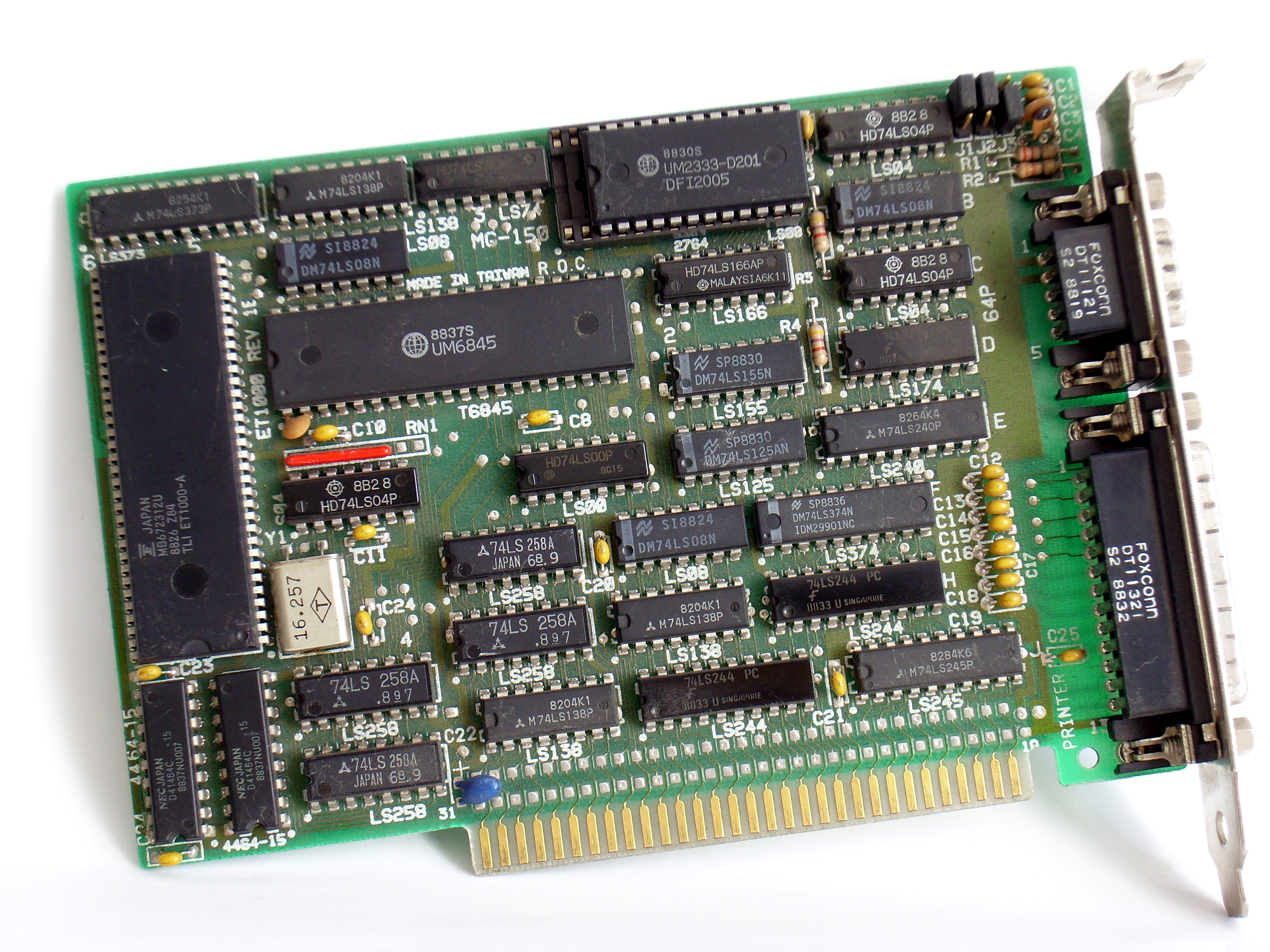
ET1000 DFI MG-150 ISA

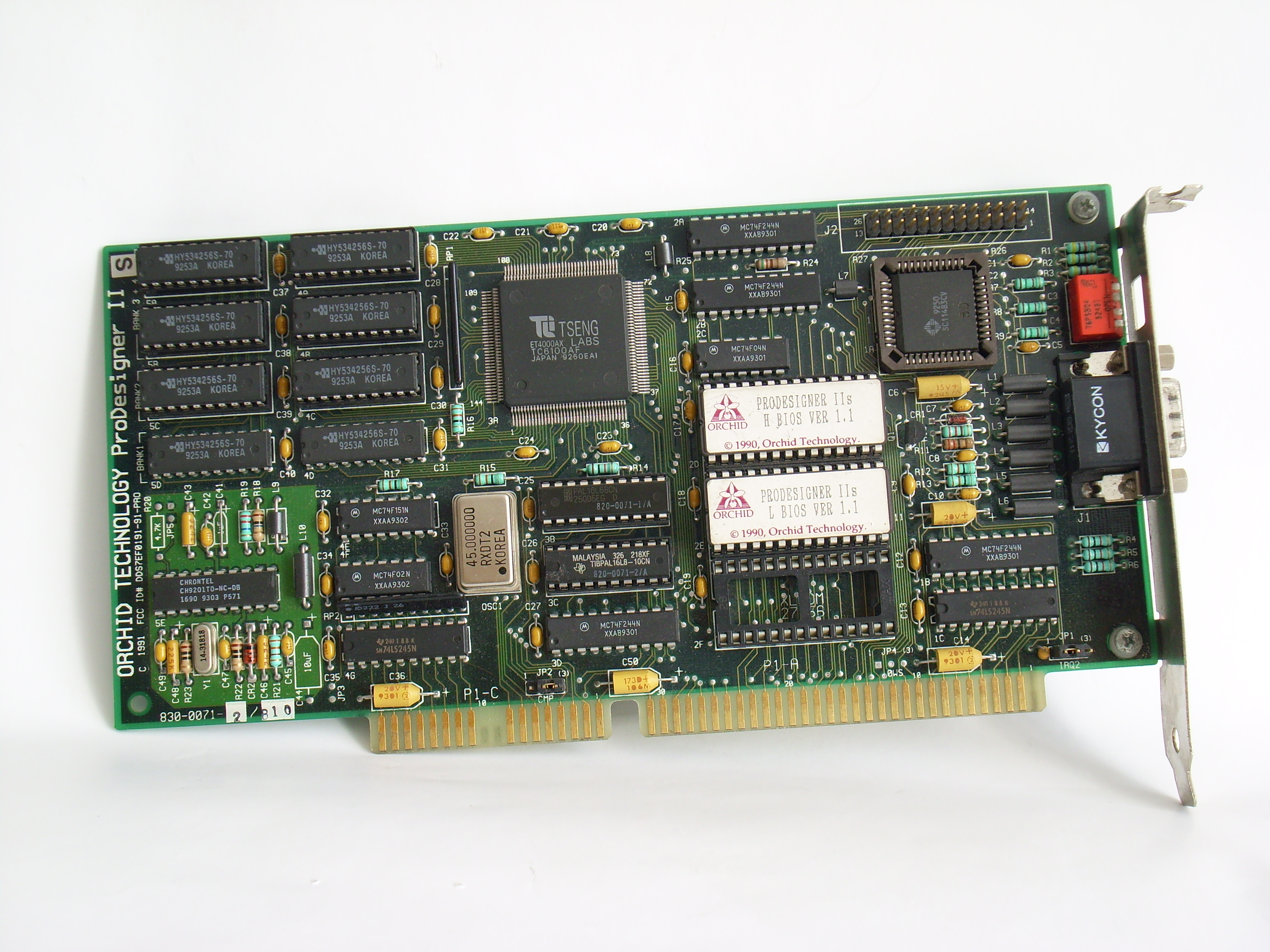
ET4000AX ISA

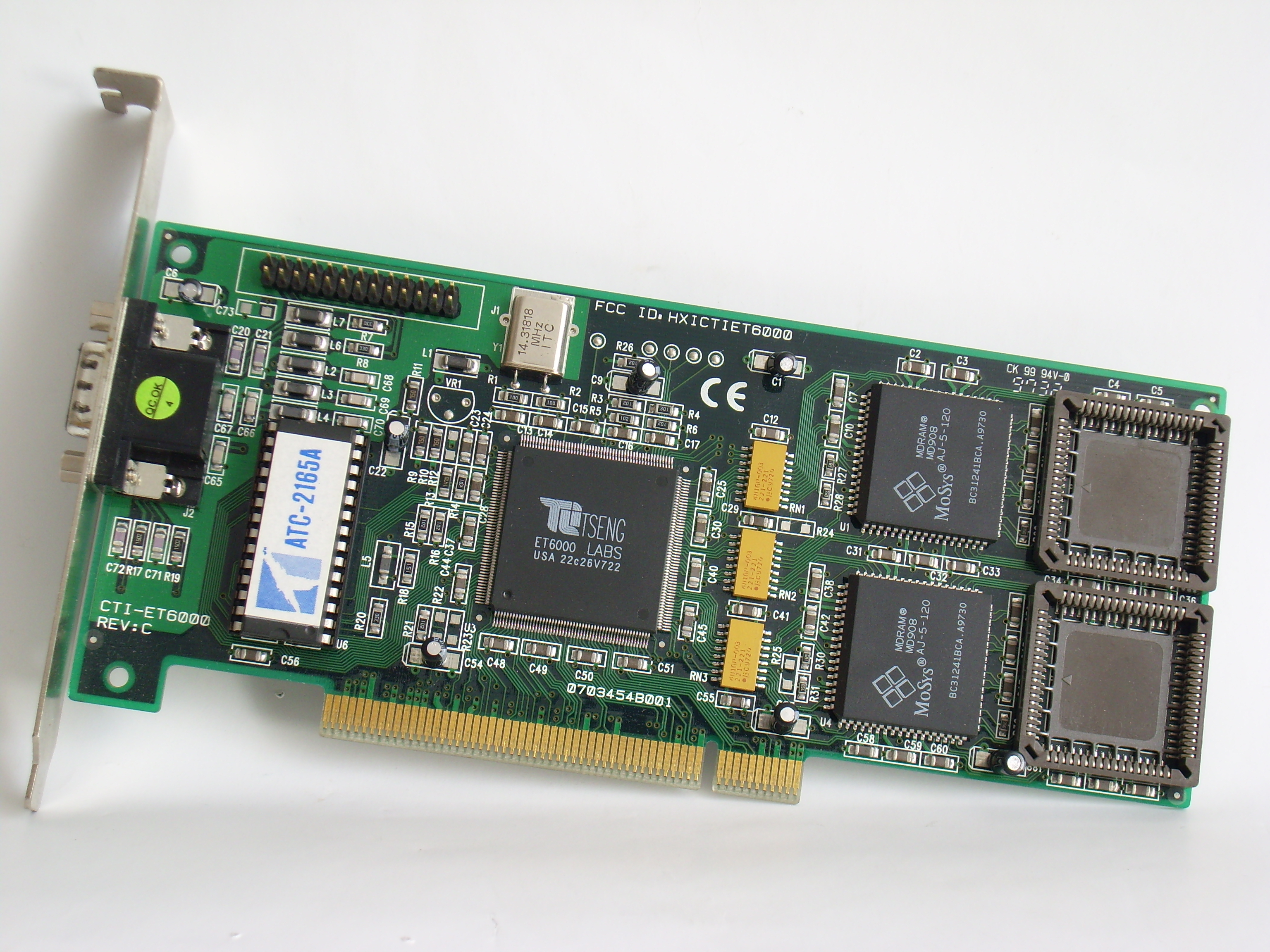
ET6000 PCI

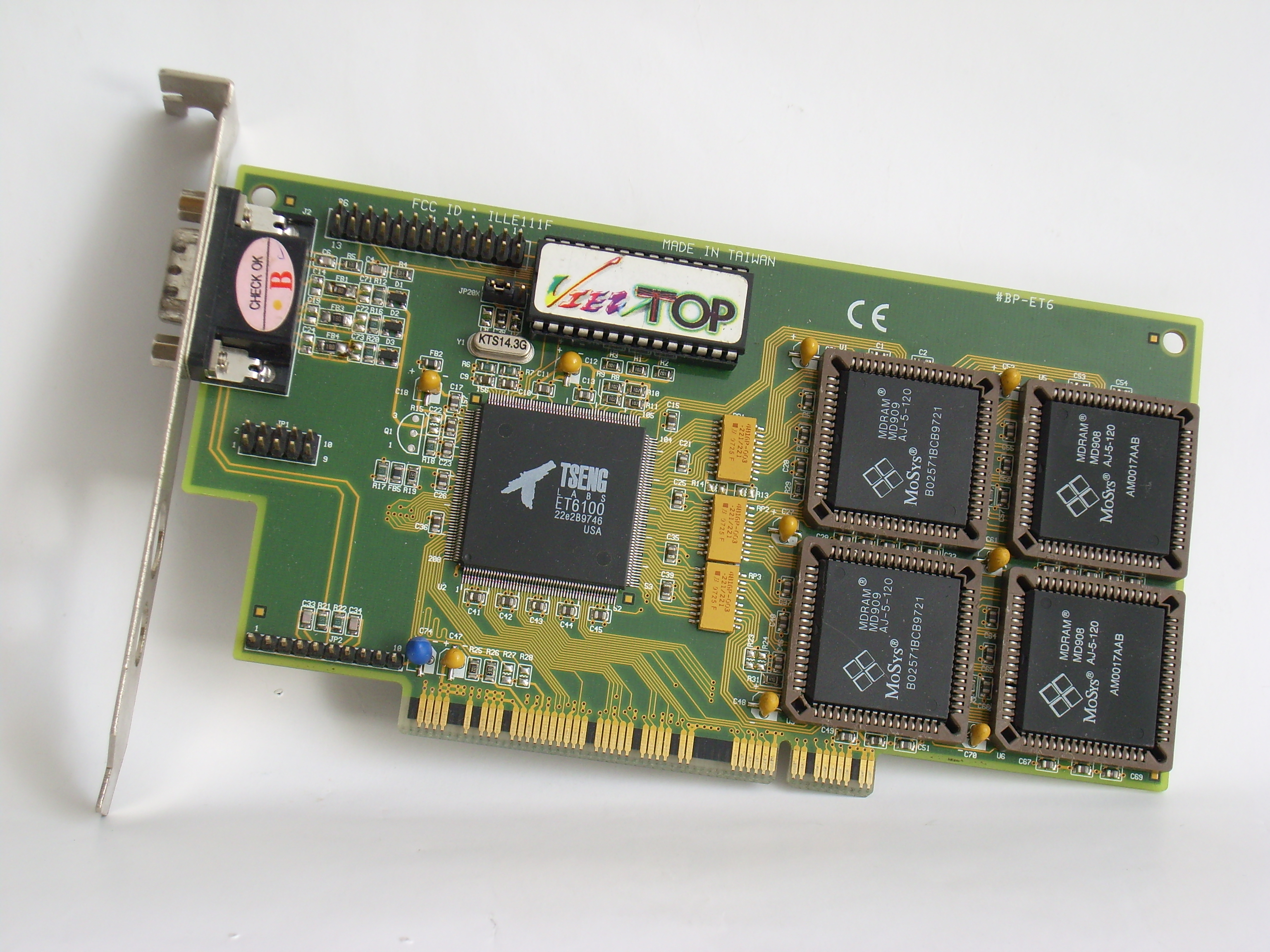
ET6100 PCI

Tseng Laboratories, Inc. (also known as Tseng Labs or TLI) was a maker of graphics chips and controllers for IBM PC compatibles, based in Newtown, Pennsylvania, and founded by Jack Hsiao Nan Tseng.

== History ==
=== 1983–1995 ===
Founded in 1983, Tseng Labs' first product was a Z80 SoftCard designed to allow IBM PCs to run the CP/M Operating System. When an OEM deal for that product was cancelled, TLI introduced a combination multifunction and graphics, called Ultrapak, which upgraded IBM PC and XT-compatible computers with some features of an IBM AT. Ultrapak also foreshadowed Tseng Labs' penchant for enhancing graphics - by providing IBM Monochrome Display Adapter (MDA) and Hercules Graphics Card (HGC) compatibility along with its own special 132 column text modes. These extended text modes created a successful niche for TLI - the cards were popularly used by corporations for PCs that also emulated mainframe terminals that displayed 132 columns. The UltraPAK Short (a graphics-only version of UltraPAK) was the base design for the DFI MG-150, which was reported to be the best selling MDA/HGC compatible card of all time.

Future Tseng products continued to push beyond mere IBM compatibility. ColorPAK - the company's CGA-compatible product - offered 'high resolution' 400 line graphics in 1985. The EVA and EVA/480 products of 1986 were the first recorded instances of a graphics chip company extending the IBM register set. EVA products enabled 130 more lines of graphics (640x480) than IBM EGA, as well as advanced features like hardware accelerated windowing, panning, and zooming.

Tseng migrated from a retail/commercial board supplier to OEM sales of its chips. Ultimately, Tseng Labs VGA controllers were found in PCs from major system and board companies including Compaq, Dell, IBM, NEC, STB Systems, Diamond Multimedia and several major Taiwanese add-in brands.

Tseng's best-known products were the Tseng Labs ET3000, Tseng Labs ET4000 and Tseng Labs ET6000 VGA-compatible graphics chips, which were highly popular between 1990 and 1995 (the era of Windows 3.x). The company's ET4000 family was noteworthy for unusually fast host-interface (ISA) throughput, despite a conventional DRAM framebuffer.

TLI was responsible for many breakthroughs in graphics common in today’s mainstream including extended register sets, packed pixel 8, 15, 16, and 24-bit color modes, the first local bus graphics designs, the first integrated local bus controller, and Image Memory Access (IMA)- a high-speed asynchronous input for video or graphics into the display buffer.

Using IMA bus, Tseng created the category of mainstream motion video accelerator with a series of video image processing circuits, branded VIPeR. VIPeR chips provided relatively high quality live and computer generated video. The chips were used in on high-end video solutions from companies like Matrox and Jazz Multimedia. Competitors integrated less elegant algorithms inside their mainstream graphics controllers - a trend Tseng followed with its latter generation of chips.

=== 1995–1998 ===
Tseng was a victim of the graphics card shakeout of the mid-1990s, losing market share to S3 Graphics and ATI Technologies. Tseng was especially late to integrate a RAMDAC into its product-line, not succeeding until the ET6000. In the later years of the ET4000's lifetime, the lack of an integrated RAMDAC severely hurt Tseng's competitiveness.

Struggling to source adequate supplies of memory for its updated cards, and lacking the funds to complete development of a modern integrated 3D engine (the ET6300), the board decided to abandon plans to ship a next generation part, and chose instead to preserve the cash pile, and seek a buyout instead.

This strategy eventually resulted in the company’s engineers and graphics expertise being purchased by ATI (now a part of AMD) in December 1997. Tseng's management chose to use the proceeds of the sale, along with the existing cash reserves, to invest in a start-up, and merged the company with pharmaceutical company Cell Pathways in 1998. The latter was acquired by OSI Pharmaceuticals in 2003.
