= C-Media =

Taiwan computer hardware company

C-Media Electronics, Inc. 驊訊電子
- Company type: Public
- Industry: Computer
- Founded: 1991; 35 years ago
- Headquarters: Taipei, Taiwan
- Products: Sound cards
- Website: www.cmedia.com.tw

C-Media Electronics, Inc. (Chinese: 驊訊電子; pinyin: Huáxùn Diànzǐ) is a Taiwan computer hardware company that manufactures processors for PC audio and USB storage, and wireless audio devices. Many of their PCI audio solutions can be found in the Xonar sound cards developed by ASUS.

== Products ==
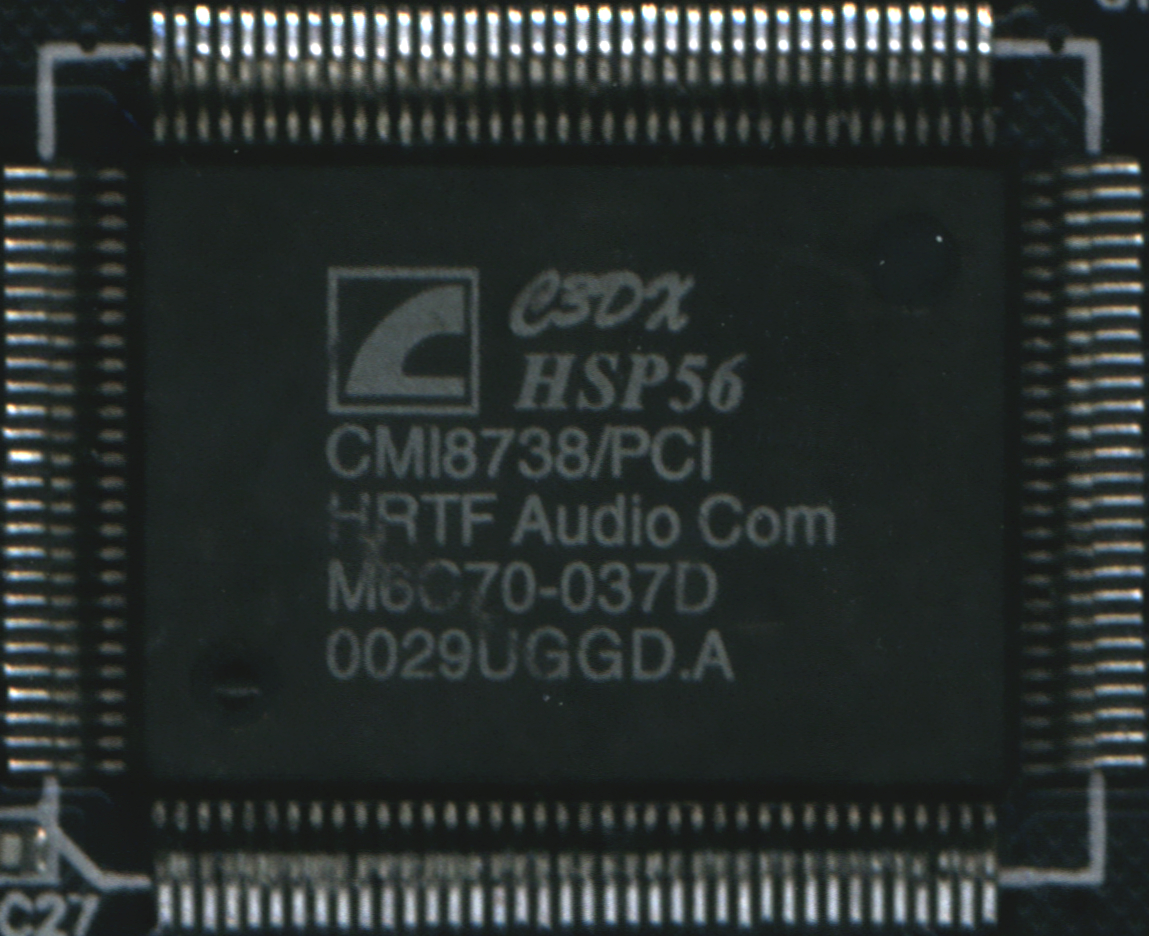
C-Media CMI8738 sound processor (PCI sound card).

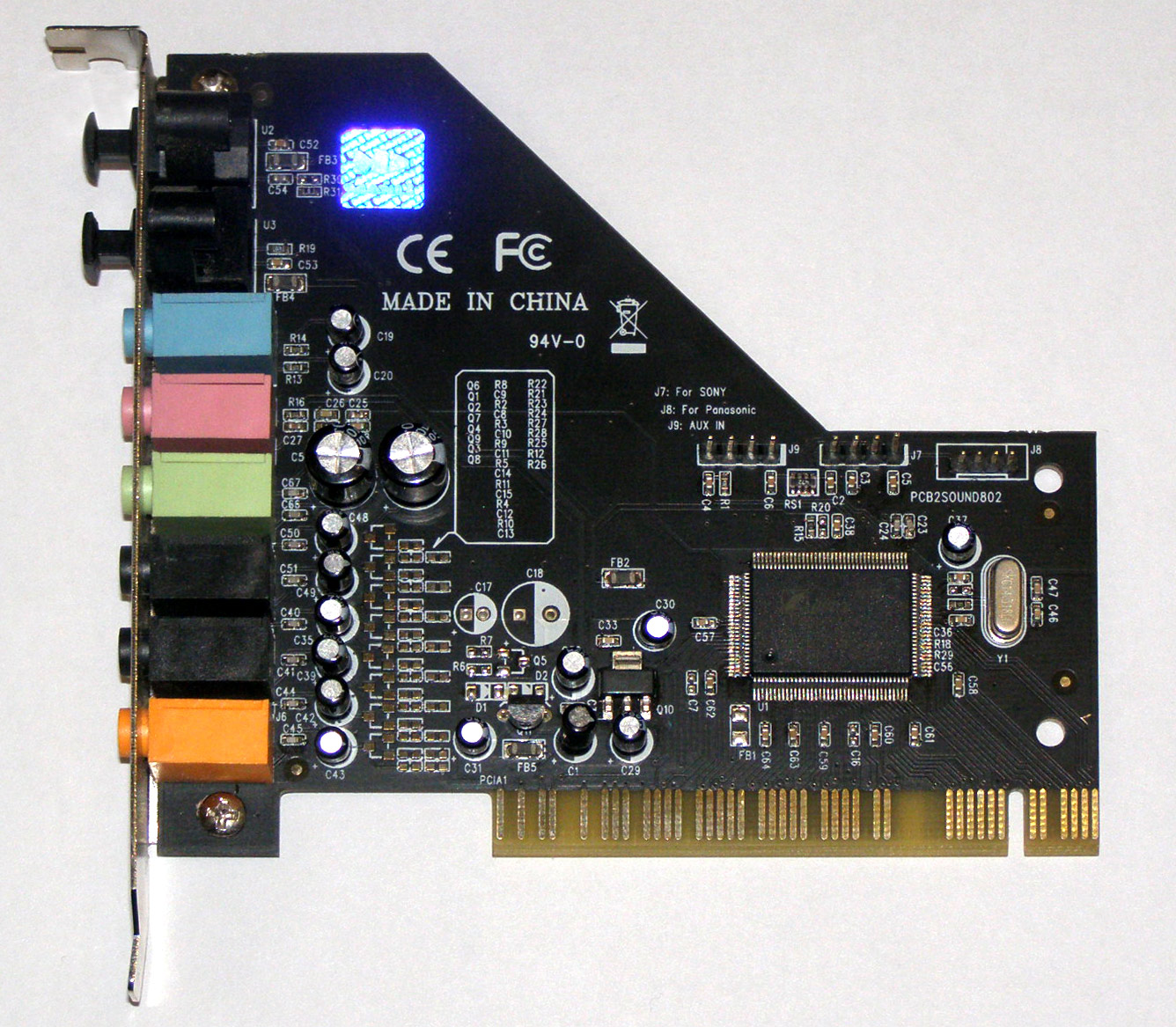
A C-Media sound card PCI 7.1 OEM (M-CMI8768-8CH)

=== ISA audio ===
- CMI8328
- CMI8330

=== PCI audio ===
- CMI8338
- CMI8738-SX supports 4-channel 16-bit DACs, 2-channel 16-bit ADC
- CMI8738-LX supports 6-channel DAC 5.1 surround, 2-channel 16-bit ADC
- CMI8738-MX supports 6-channel DAC 5.1 surround, S/PDIF IN/OUT (44.1K and 48KHz), 2-channel 16-bit ADC
- CMI8768
- CMI8768+ (Dolby Digital Live encoding)
- CMI8769
- CMI8770 (Dolby Digital Live & DTS Connect encoding)
- Oxygen HD CMI8786
- Oxygen HD CMI8787

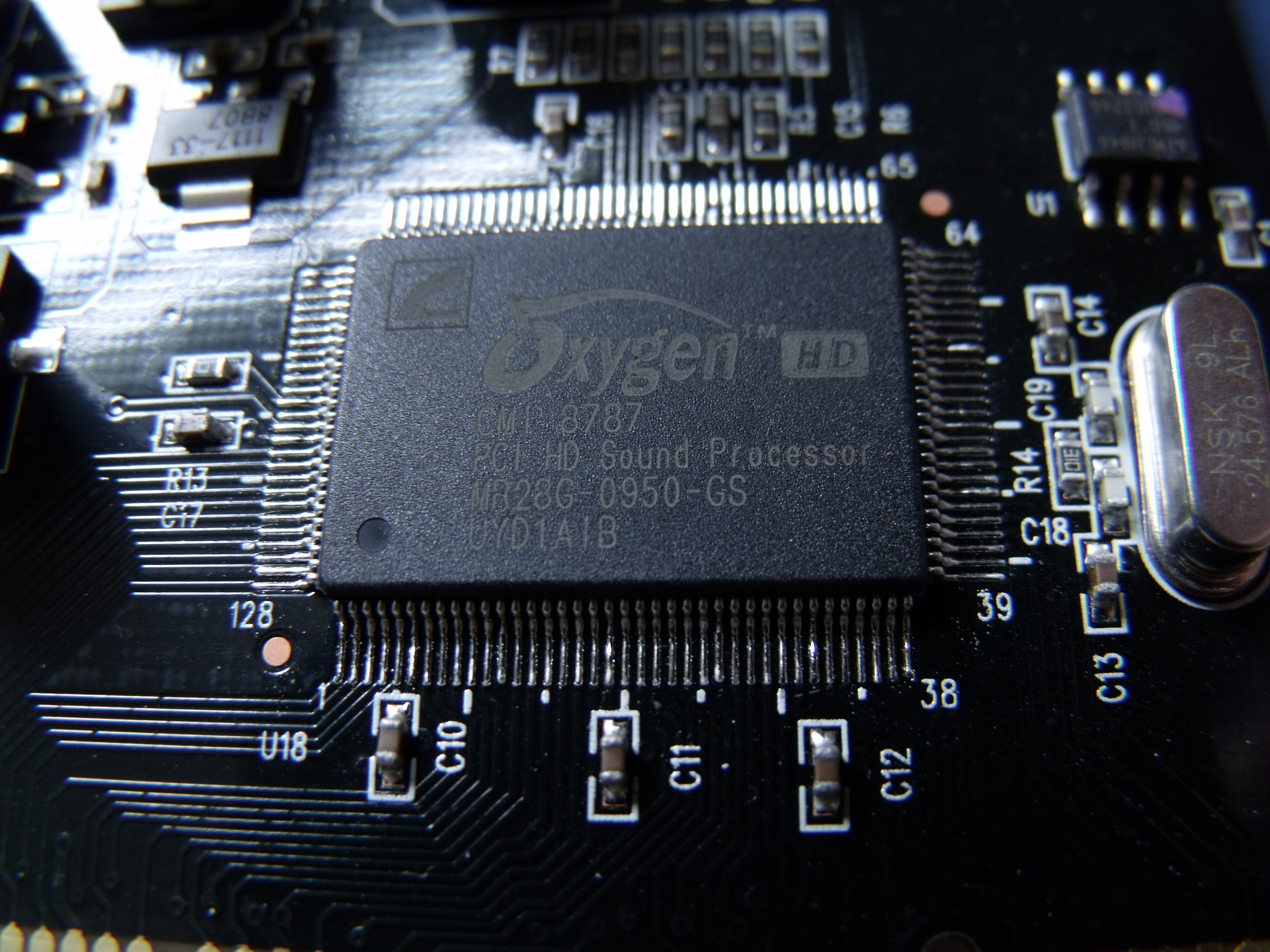
C-Media Oxygen HD CMI8787 sound processor on a PCI sound card.

- Oxygen HD CMI8788 (Dolby Digital Live & DTS Connect encoding)

=== AC'97 audio ===
- CMI9738
- CMI9739
- CMI9761
- CMI9780

=== HD Audio ===
- CMI9880 (some of them have Dolby Digital Live certification)
- CM8888 (Oxygen Express-series) APPLICATIONS : PowerColor Devil HDX Sound Card
- CMI8828 (Oxygen Express-series) APPLICATIONS : HT OMEGA FENIX Sound Card, SUNWEIT ST15, SUNWEIT ST16
- CM8826 (Oxygen Express-series)

=== USB audio ===
- CM102A+/S+
- CM108AH
- CM108B
- CM118B
- CM119B/BN
- CM6206
- CM6206-LX
- CM6300
- CM6302
- CM6317A
- CM6327A
- CM6400
- CM6400X1
- CM6500B
- CM6502B
- CM6510B
- CM6523B
- CM6530N
- CM6531N
- CM6533(N)
- CM6533DH
- CM6533X1
- CM6535
- HS-100B

=== Wi-Sonic network audio ===
- CMWS-01: Uses CMI8769 for audio.
- WS-011
- WS-012
- WS-021
- WS-022
- WS-101

=== USB storage ===
- CM120 (Support for this product does not exist in C-Media.tw)
- CM220
  - CM220F
  - CM220L
  - CM220S
- CM320
  - CM320L
  - CM320S

== Sensaura licence expiry ==
C-Media's Sensaura licence expired on 23 September 2008. While there is an article promoting new Xear3D EX with OpenAL support, replacement drivers are not available at the current time.

As of 26 September 2011, drivers are now available for some PCI chipset models.

- CMI 8738
- CMI 8768
- CMI 8768+
- CMI 8770
- CMI 8787
- CMI 8788

== See also ==
- List of sound card manufacturers
- List of Taiwanese companies
- AC'97
- Sound card
