= Asus Xonar =

Lineup of PC sound cards

Asus Xonar is a lineup of PC sound cards by Taiwanese electronics manufacturer ASUS.
The lineup comprises the following models:

| Product | Form factor | Release date | Notes | References |
|---|---|---|---|---|
| Xonar AE | PCIe | | | |
| Xonar AV1 | PCIe | | | |
| Xonar D1 | PCI | | | |
| Xonar D2 | PCI | | | |
| Xonar D2/PM | PCI | | | |
| Xonar D2X | PCIe | | PCI Express version of the Xonar D2 | |
| Xonar DG | PCI | | | |
| Xonar DGX | PCIe | 13 March 2012 | PCI Express version of the Xonar DG | |
| Xonar DS | PCI | | | |
| Xonar DSX | PCIe | 13 March 2012 | PCI Express version of the Xonar DS | |
| Xonar DX | PCIe | 8 February 2008 | | |
| Xonar Essence One | External (USB) | 26 August 2011 | Interchangeable op-amps. Later released same card with different installed op-amps as Essence One Plus and MUSES Edition. | |
| Xonar Essence ST | PCI | 18 May 2009 | | |
| Xonar Essence STU | External (USB) | | | |
| Xonar Essence STX | PCIe | 13 November 2008 | PCI Express version of the Xonar Essence ST | |
| Xonar Essence STX II | PCIe | | | |
| Xonar Essence STX II 7.1 | PCIe | | | |
| Xonar H6 | PCIe | | DAC expansion board for HDAV1.3 and Essence ST. | |
| Xonar HDAV | PCIe | | | |
| Xonar HDAV1.3 | PCIe | | | |
| Xonar Phoebus | PCIe | 12 April 2012 | The two sound cards are the same; the Phoebus comes bundled with an external desktop controller that is not included with the Phoebus Solo. | |
| Xonar Phoebus Solo | PCIe | 22 April 2013 | The two sound cards are the same; the Phoebus comes bundled with an external desktop controller that is not included with the Phoebus Solo. | |
| Xonar SE | PCIe | July 2019 | | |
| Xonar STX | PCIe | | | |
| Xonar U1 | External (USB) | | | |
| Xonar U3 | External (USB) | 23 December 2014 | | |
| Xonar U5 | External (USB) | 14 July 2014 | | |
| Xonar U7 | External (USB) | April 2013 | | |
| Xonar U7 MKII | External (USB) | 12 December 2016 | | |
| Xonar Xense | PCIe | | | |

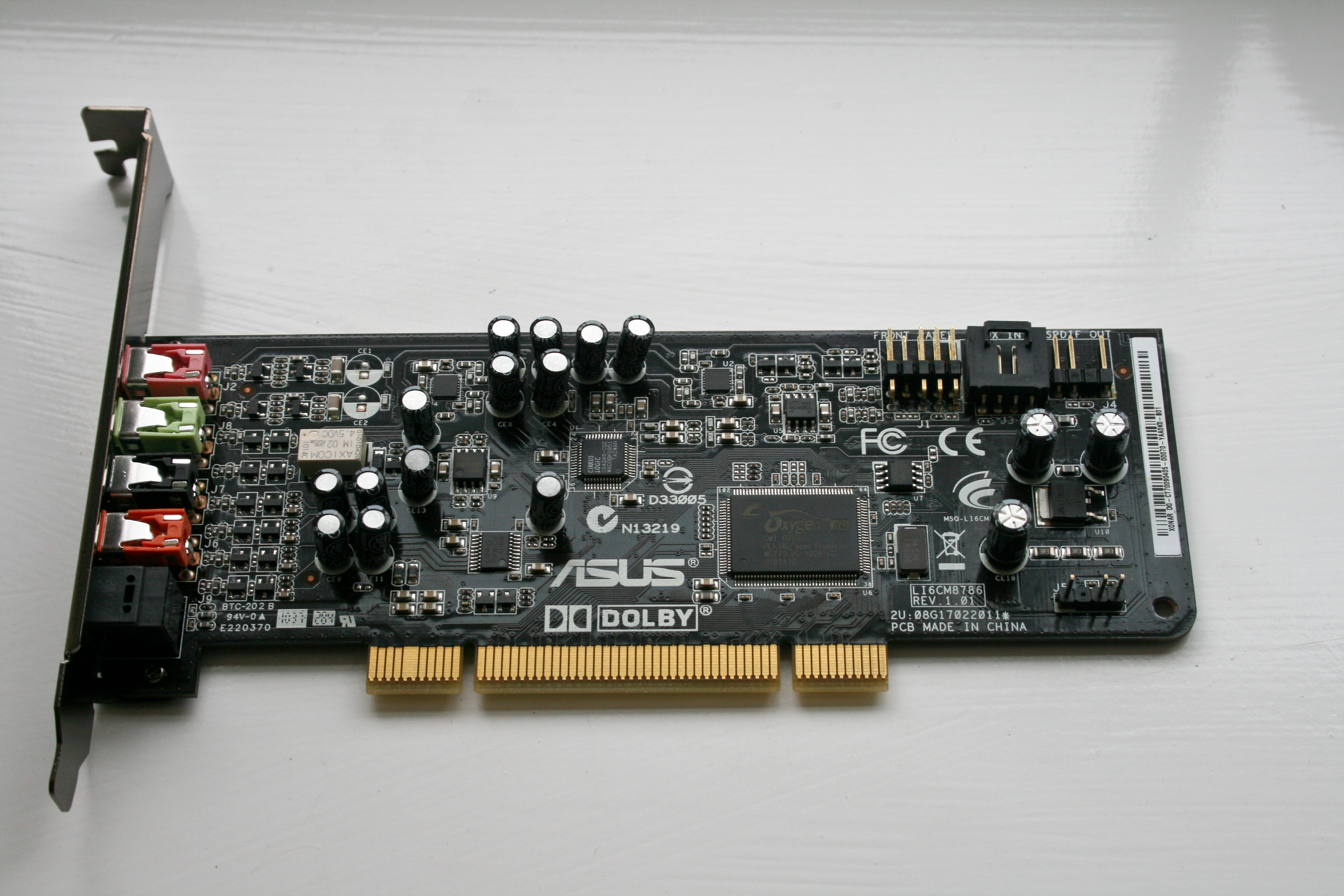
Xonar DG

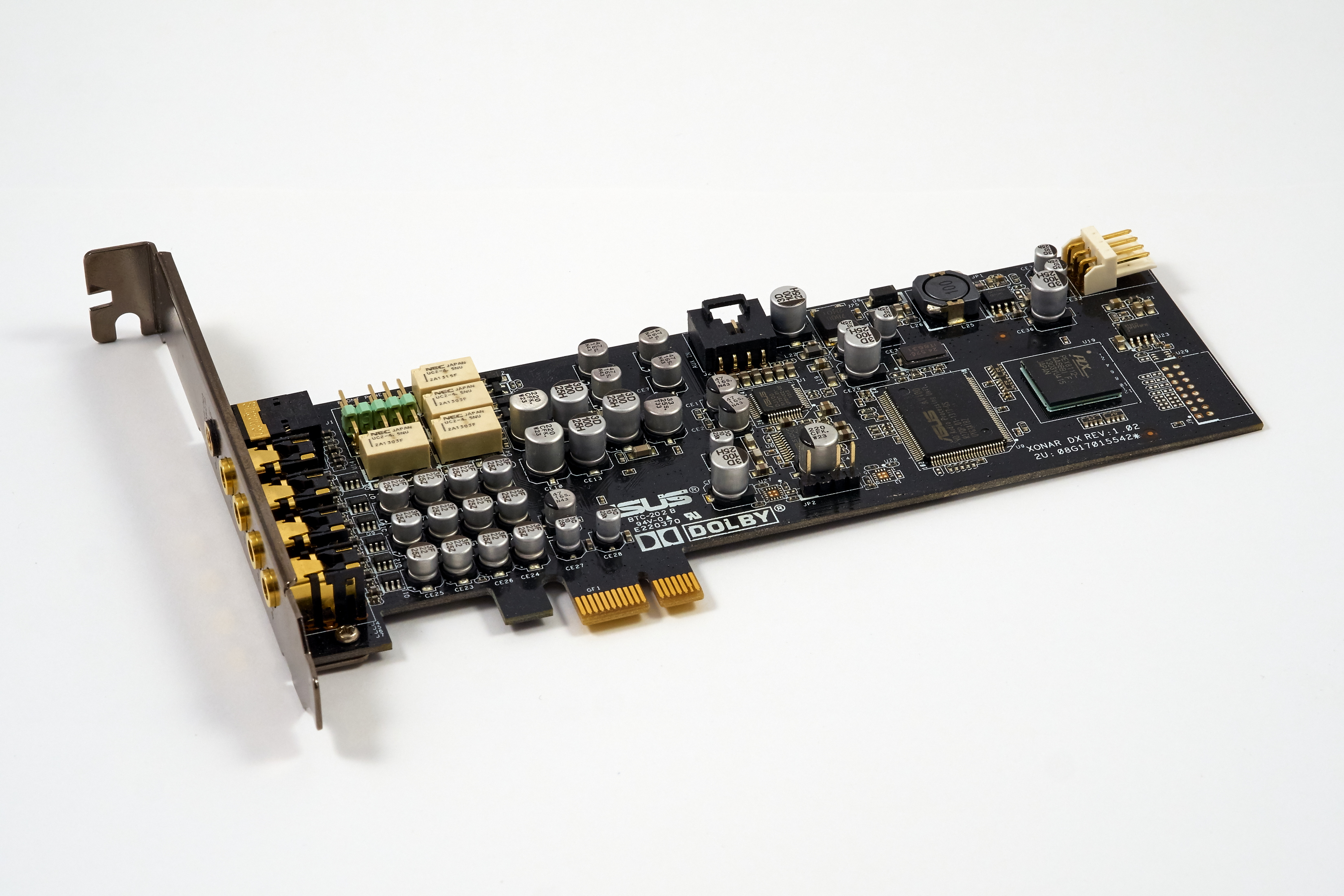
Xonar DX

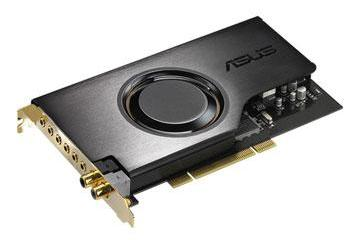
Xonar D2/PM

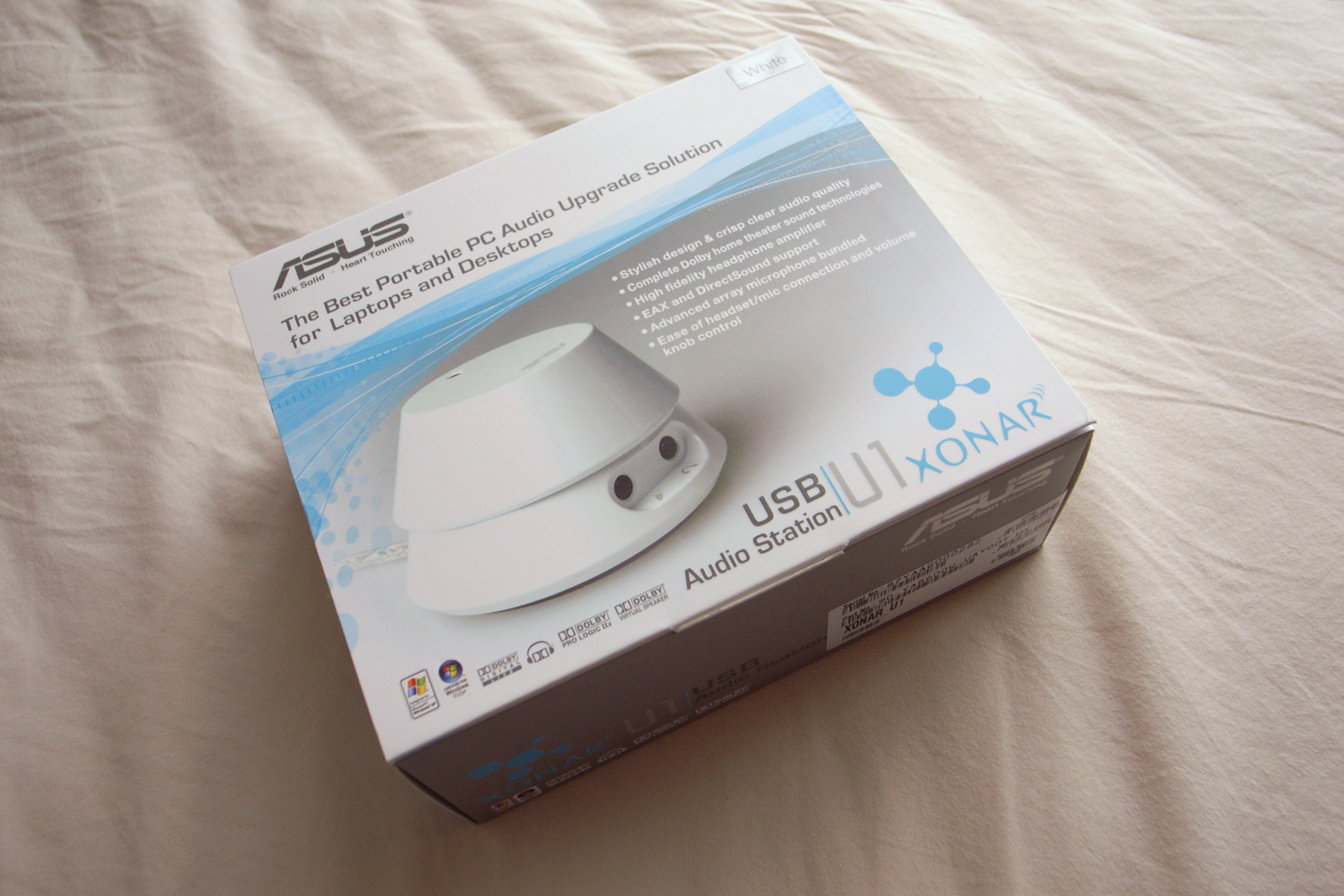
Xonar U1
