= List of graphics chips and card companies =

During the 1980s and 1990s, a relatively large number of companies appeared selling primarily 2D graphics cards and later 3D. Most of those companies have subsequently disappeared, as the increasing complexity of GPUs substantially increased research and development costs. Many of these companies subsequently went bankrupt or were bought out. Amongst the notable discrete graphics card vendors, AMD and Nvidia are the only ones that have lasted. In 2022, Intel entered the discrete GPU market with the Arc series and has three more generations confirmed on two year release schedules.

There are currently 106 manufacturers in this incomplete list.

== Graphics chip makers ==
Many of the companies listed below also design(ed) graphics cards.

Name	Country of origin	Year of market entry	Year of market exit	Fate	Notes
3dfx	United States	1994	2001	Bankruptcy; acquired by Nvidia in 2002	
3Dlabs	United States	1994	2009	Merged with Creative Labs' personal entertainment division to form ZiiLABS	
ALi	Taiwan	1987	2006	Acquired by Nvidia	Formerly a division of Acer, full name Acer Laboratories Incorporated
Alphamosaic	United Kingdom	2000	2004	Acquired by Broadcom	Original developers of the VideoCore series of discrete mobile GPUs
AMD	United States	2006	Active		Current developers of the Radeon series; entered graphics chip industry after acquiring ATI Technologies in 2006
Apple	United States	2016	Active		Entered the graphics card market in 1981; began developing GPUs with the A10 SoC in 2016 (based on Imagination's PowerVR) and introduced their first entirely in-house GPU with the A11 SoC in 2017
ARK Logic	United States	1993	1999	Bankruptcy	
Arm Holdings	United Kingdom	2005	Active		Developers of the Mali and Immortalis lines of mobile GPUs
ArtX	United States	1997	2000	Acquired by ATI Technologies	
ATI Technologies	Canada	1985	2006	Acquired by AMD	Pioneering company, developers of the Wonder, the Mach, the Rage, the All-in-Wonder, and finally the Radeon series of graphics cards
Avance Logic	United States	1991	2002	Acquired by Realtek in 1995; dissolved in 2002	
BitBoys	Finland	1991	2009	Acquired by ATI Technologies	
Broadcom	United States	2004	Active		Current developers of the VideoCore series; entered graphics chip industry after acquiring Alphamosaic in 2004
Chips and Technologies	United States	1984	1997	Acquired by Intel	
Chromatic Research	United States	1993	1998	Acquired by ATI Technologies	
Cirrus Logic	United States	1984	2005	Spun off graphics chip division to create Magnum Semiconductor, which was acquired by IDT in 2017	
Evans & Sutherland	United States	1968	2001	Sold its graphics chip assets to Real Vision	Still active in the computer simulation business
Gemini Technology	Canada	1984	1990	Bankruptcy; acquired by Seiko Epson to form the Vancouver Design Center	
Genoa Systems	United States	1984	2002	Bankruptcy	
GigaPixel	United States	1997	2000	Acquired by 3dfx	
Headland Technology	United States	1989	1993	Sold its graphics chip assets to Spea Software	Formerly a division of LSI Logic's Standard Products Group
Imagination Technologies	United Kingdom	1985	Active		Founded as VideoLogic; developers of the PowerVR series
Integrated Information Technology	United States	1987	Unknown	Exited the graphics chip industry	Following exit became 8x8, a provider of videoconferencing and VoIP products
Intel	United States	1982	Active		Entered the graphics chip industry after becoming the second source for NEC's μPD7220 in 1982; entered the discrete GPU market with the Arc series in 2022
iXMicro	United States	1994	2000	Bankruptcy	Produced graphics cards for Macintosh and Macintosh clones
Jingjia Micro	China	2006	Active		China's largest producer of GPUs
Matrox	Canada	1976	Unknown	Exited the graphics chip industry	Once a mass manufacturer of graphics chips, now targets niche markets; still produces graphics cards based on Intel's Arc GPUs
Metheus	United States	1981	1999	Acquired by Barco Display Systems	
Moore Threads	China	2020	Active		Developers of the MTT series, China's first domestically produced graphics card
MOS Technology	United States	1979	2000	Dissolution	Produced the VIC and TED lines of graphics chips; owned by Commodore International
NEC	Japan	1979	Unknown	Exited the graphics chip industry	Produced the influential μPD7220, widely used in 1980s microcomputers
NeoMagic	United States	1993	Active		Supplier of mobile SoCs with integrated GPUs
Number Nine Visual Technology	United States	1982	1999	Acquired by S3	Developed the first 128-bit graphics processor
Nvidia	United States	1993	Active		Developers of the GeForce series; largest producer of discrete desktop graphics chips as of 2023
Oak Technology	United States	1987	2003	Acquired by Zoran	
OPTi	United States	1993	2001	Dissolution	
Paradise Systems	United States	1982	1996	Dissolution	Acquired by Western Digital in 1986, then sold to Philips in 1995
Primus Technology	United States	1992	1993	Disappeared from the marketplace	Produced a Windows accelerator by the name P2000
Qualcomm	United States	2008	Active		Developers of the Adreno series
Radius	United States	1986	2002	Acquired by Media 100	Produced graphics solutions primarily for Apple Computer
Raycer	United States	1996	1999	Acquired by Apple Computer	
Real3D	United States	1995	1999	Acquired by Intel	
Realtek	Taiwan	1995	Unknown	Exited the graphics chip industry	
Rendition	United States	1993	1998	Acquired by Micron Technology	
S3 Graphics	United States	1989	2000	Merged with Diamond Multimedia, then sold off its core graphics division to VIA Technologies; later sold off to HTC	
Samsung Electronics	South Korea	2022	Active		Began employing AMD's RDNA GPU microarchitecture into their Exynos SoCs in 2022
Silicon Graphics	United States	1981	2006	Stopped developing graphics chips in-house in 2006 and started buying GPUs from other companies	Later went completely defunct in 2009; its assets were bought in the resulting Chapter 11 bankruptcy by Rackable Systems, which changed its name to Silicon Graphics International
Silicon Image	United States	1995	2015	Acquired by Lattice Semiconductor	
Silicon Integrated Systems	Taiwan	1997	2003	Spun off graphics chip division to form XGI	
Tamarack Microelectronics	Taiwan	1987	2002	Merged with IC Plus in 2002	
Texas Instruments	United States	1979	Unknown	Exited the graphics chip industry	
Trident Microsystems	United States	1987	2003	Sold its graphics chip assets to XGI in 2003	Following exit entered bankruptcy in 2012
Tseng Labs	United States	1983	1998	Sold its graphics chip assets to ATI Technologies in 1997	
United Microelectronics Corporation	Taiwan	1980	Unknown	Exited the graphics chip industry	Following exit in the late 1990s became a chip foundry
VIA Technologies	Taiwan	1999	2011	Exited the graphics chip industry	Entered the graphics chip industry after forming a joint venture with S3
Video Seven	United States	1984	1989	Merged with G-2 Inc., a subsidiary of LSI Logic, to form Headland Technology	
Vivante Corporation	United States	2004	2015	Acquired by VeriSilicon	
Weitek	United States	1991	1996	Bankruptcy	Producer of the Power9000 series of GPUs from circa 1991 to 1994
Western Digital Imaging	United States	1986	1995	Dissolution	Formed as the result of merger between Paradise Systems and Verticom Inc.
ZiiLABS	United States	2009	2012	Assets split between Creative Technology and Intel	

== Graphics card makers ==
Name	Country of origin	Year of market entry	Year of market exit	Chips used	Fate	Notes
Acer	Taiwan	1987	Active	Arc, Radeon, ALi (formerly)		
Actix Systems	United States	1990	1998	S3	Dissolution	
Appian Graphics	United States	1994	2001		Acquired by ATI Technologies	
Artist Graphics	United States	1979	1995		Bankruptcy	
ASRock	Taiwan	2002	Active	Arc, Radeon		
Asus	Taiwan	1996	Active	GeForce, Radeon, ViRGE (formerly)		
BFG Technologies	United States	2002	2010		Bankruptcy	
Biostar	Taiwan	2004	Active	Radeon, GeForce		
Boca Research	United States	1989	2002		Acquired by Ener1	
Cardinal Technologies	United States	1991	1997		Bankruptcy	
Chaintech	Taiwan	Unknown	Unknown	GeForce		
Creative Technology	Singapore	1994	Unknown	Various		
Cromemco	United States	1975	1987		Sold to Dynatech Corporation	Introduced the first color graphics card for microcomputers, the Dazzler, in 1976
Diamond Multimedia	United States	1989	Active	Various		
Elitegroup Computer Systems	Taiwan	1992	Active			
ELSA Technology	Germany	1989	Active	GeForce, S3 (formerly)		
EVGA	United States	1999	2022	GeForce	Exited the graphics card industry; still in business	
Foxconn	Taiwan	2004	Unknown	GeForce		
Gainward	Taiwan	1995	Active	GeForce, Trio (formerly), ViRGE (formerly)		
GALAX	Hong Kong	1994	Active	GeForce		
Gigabyte Technology	Taiwan	Unknown	Active	GeForce, Radeon		
GUNNIR	China	Unknown	Active	Arc		
Hercules Computer Technology	United States	1982	1998		Acquired by Guillemot Corporation	
Hightech Information System	Hong Kong	2002	Active	Radeon		
Colorful Co., Ltd.	China	1995	Active	GeForce		
Innovation Computer	United States	1983	Unknown		Dissolution	
Leadtek	Taiwan	1995	Active	GeForce, Tseng Labs (formerly)		
Manli	Hong Kong	2001	Active	GeForce		
Maxsun	Taiwan	2002	Active	Arc, Radeon, GeForce		
Media Vision	United States	1990	1996		Bankruptcy	
Micro-Star International	Taiwan	1986	Active	Radeon, GeForce		
Nth Graphics	United States	1986	Unknown		Bankruptcy	
Orchid Technology	United States	1982	1994		Acquired by Micronics Computers, then by Diamond Multimedia	
Palit Microsystems	Taiwan	1988	Active	GeForce, Trident (formerly), S3 (formerly)		
PNY Technologies	United States	2001	Active	GeForce		
Point of View	Netherlands	2000	Active	GeForce		
PowerColor	Taiwan	1997	Active	Radeon		
Quantum3D	United States	1997	Active			
Sapphire Technology	Hong Kong	2001	Active	Radeon		
Sparkle Computer	Taiwan	2000	Active	Arc, GeForce (formerly)		
Spea Software	Germany	1985	1995		Acquired by Diamond Multimedia in 1995, then by ATI Technologies in 2001	
STB Systems	United States	1981	1999		Acquired by 3dfx	
Vectrix	United States	1980	1993		Bankruptcy	
Vermont Microsystems	United States	1982	Unknown		Bankruptcy	
XFX	United States	2002	Active	Radeon, GeForce (formerly)		
Zotac	Hong Kong	2006	Active	GeForce		
