= Professional Graphics Controller =

Graphics adapter and display standard for early IBM PCs

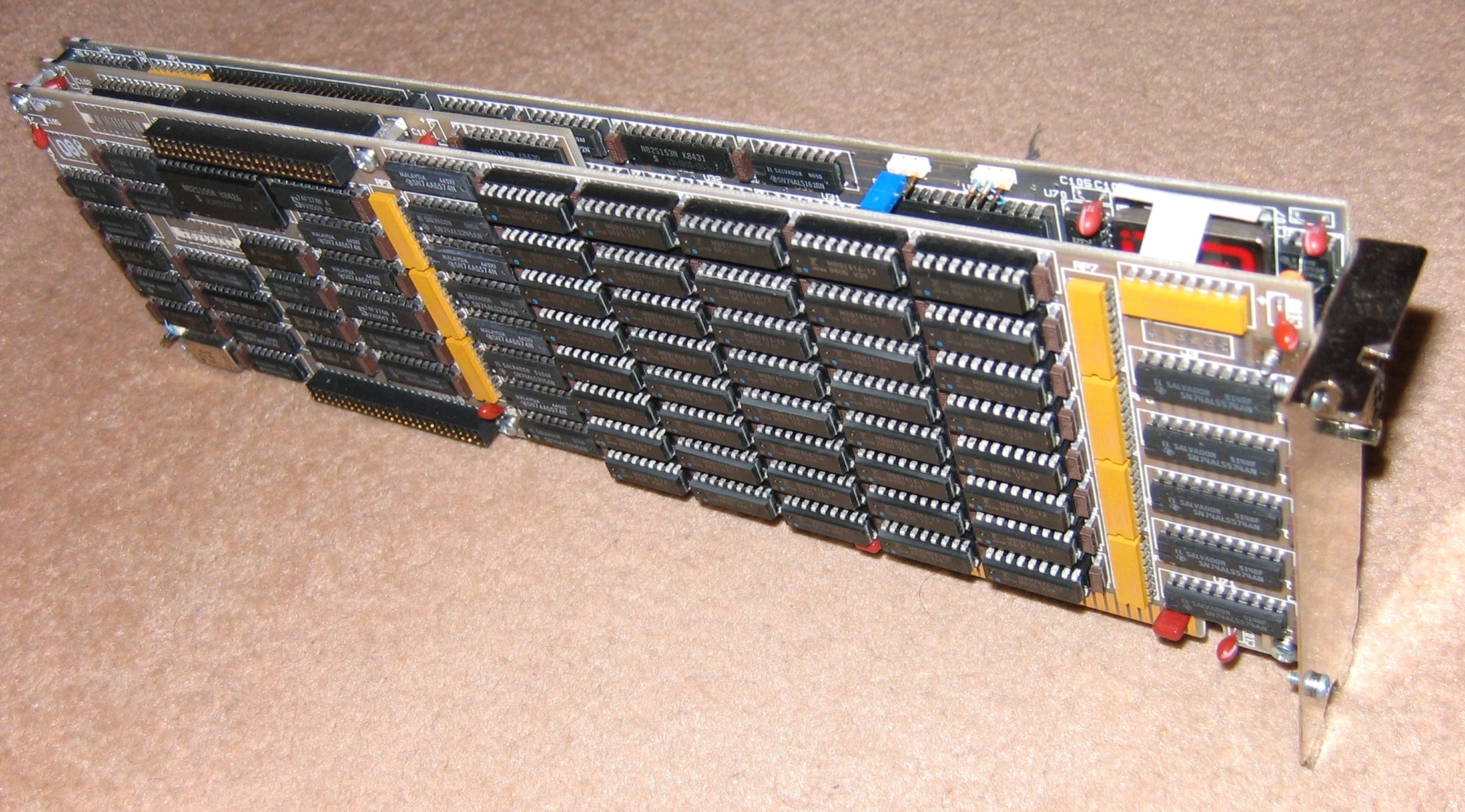
- Release date: September 1984; 42 years ago
- Designed by: Vermont Microsystems
- Marketed by: IBM
- Architecture: Intel 8088

Cards
- High-end: IBM 1501 PGC; Matrox PG-640, PG-1280 and QG-640; Dell NEC MVA-1024; Everex EPGA; Orchid Technology TurboPGA; Vermont Microsystems IM-640 and IM-1024

History
- Predecessor: Color Graphics Adapter
- Successor: VGA, 8514

Professional Graphics Controller (PGC, often called Professional Graphics Adapter and sometimes Professional Graphics Array) is a graphics card manufactured by IBM for PCs. It consists of three interconnected PCBs, and contains its own processor and memory. The PGC was, at the time of its release, the most advanced graphics card for the IBM XT and aimed for tasks such as CAD. It was designed and manufactured for IBM by Vermont Microsystems, a start-up company founded by ex-IBM employees.

== Specifications ==
Introduced in September 1984, the Professional Graphics Controller offered a maximum resolution of 640 × 480 with 256 colors on an analog RGB monitor via a DE-9 connector, at a refresh rate of 60 hertz—a higher resolution and color depth than CGA and EGA supported. This mode is not BIOS-supported. It was intended for the computer-aided design market and included 320 KB of display RAM and an on-board Intel 8088 microprocessor. The 8088 ran software routines for 2D and 3D graphics such as "draw polygon" and "fill area" from an on-board 64 KB ROM so that the host CPU didn't need to load and run these routines itself. While never widespread in consumer-class personal computers, its US$2,995 (equivalent to $9,300 in 2025) list price, plus $1,295 display, compared favorably to US$50,000 dedicated CAD workstations of the time (even when the $4,995 price of a PC XT Model 87 was included).

== Development ==
The Professional Graphics Controller was developed by Winooski-based start-up company Vermont Microsystems. Founded by two ex-IBM employees, VMI won a competitive bid to develop IBM's next-generation graphics adapter for the IBM PC in 1983. Their partnership resulted in the PGC, designed to allow the PC to run CAD/CAM software in high resolution and color depth. The PGC was principally designed by Curtis Priem, then a recent hire of VMI who later co-founded Nvidia in 1993. While IBM initially only wanted VMI to design the PGC while leaving manufacturing to IBM, Richards refused to agree to the bid unless IBM also allowed VMI to manufacture the cards as well. In a move described as uncharacteristic by The Wall Street Journal, IBM agreed to these terms.

The PGC was discontinued in 1987 with the arrival of VGA and 8514.

== Software support ==
The board was targeted at the CAD market, therefore limited software support is to be expected. The only software systems known to support the PGC are IBM's Graphical Kernel System, P-CAD 4.5, VersaCAD, Canyon State Systems CompuShow and AutoCAD 2.5.

== Output capabilities ==
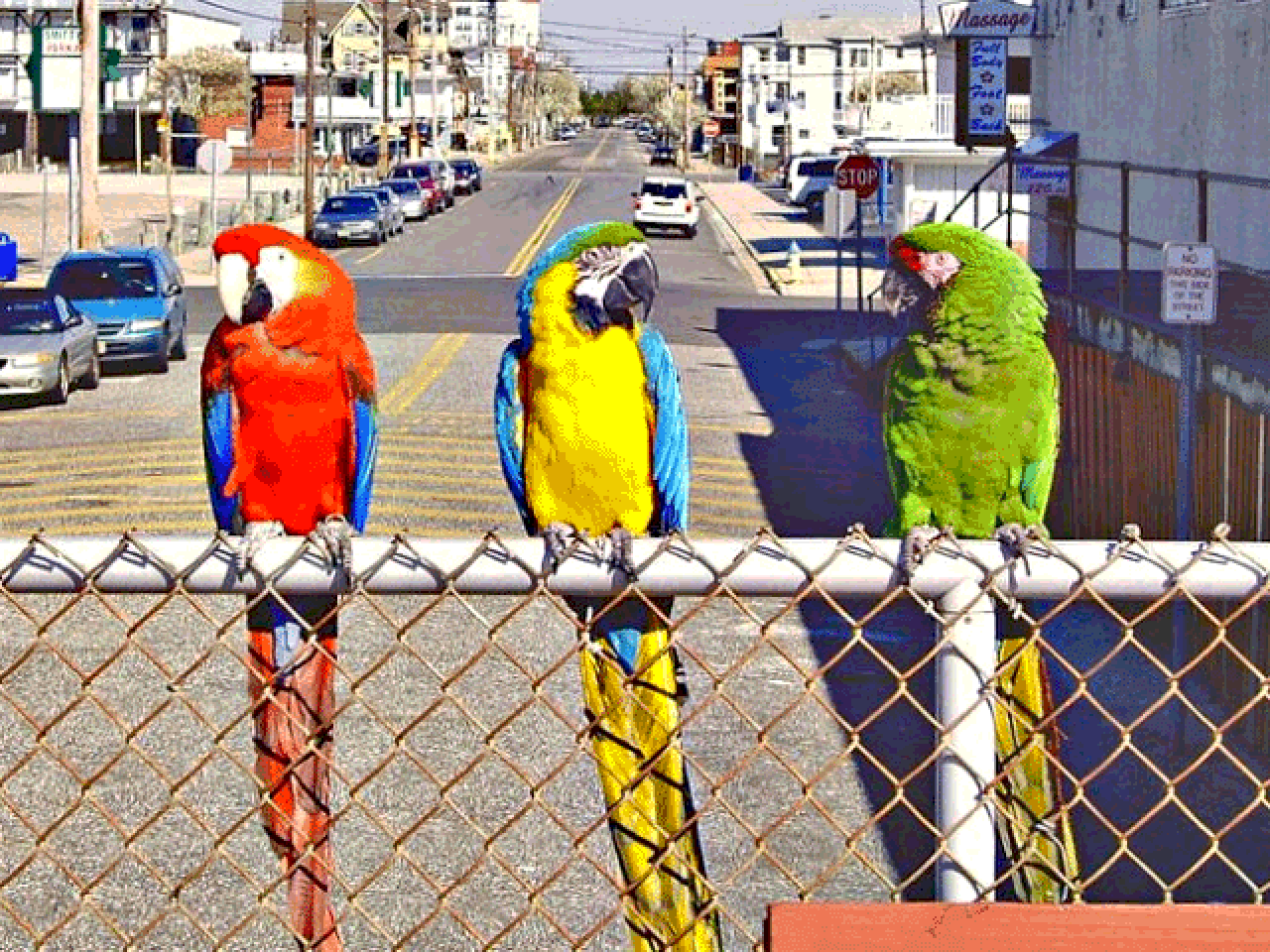
Simulated image as displayed using the Professional Graphics Controller 640 × 480 with 256 colors resolution

PGC supports:

- 640 × 480 with 256 colors from a palette of 4,096 (12-bit RGB palette, or 4 bits per color component).
- Color Graphics Adapter text and graphics modes. Text modes use a font with 8×16-pixel character cells and have 400 rows of pixels.

There are six possible color arrangements:

- Default 256-colour palette - Low 4 bits intensity, high 4 bits colour;
- 16-colour palette - Makes the PGC behave as two 16-colour planes. If high 4 bits are 0, low 4 bits are colour; otherwise, high 4 bits are colour;
- 2-3-3 palette (Palette 2) - Bits 6-7 red, bits 3-5 green, bits 0-2 blue;
- 3-2-3 palette (Palette 3) - Bits 5-7 red, bits 3-4 green, bits 0-2 blue;
- 3-3-2 palette (Palette 4) - Bits 5-7 red, bits 2-4 green; bits 0-1 blue;
- 6x6x6 colour cube - six equally spaced shades of red, green, and blue.

== Operation ==
The display adapter was composed of three physical circuit boards (one with the on-board microprocessor, firmware ROMs and video output connector, one providing CGA emulation, and the third mostly carrying RAM) and occupied two adjacent expansion slots on the XT or AT motherboard or the Expansion Unit; the third card was located in between the two slots. The PGC could not be used in the original IBM PC without the 5161 Expansion Unit due to the different spacing of its slots.

In addition to its native 640 × 480 mode, the PGC optionally supported the documented text and graphics modes of the Color Graphics Adapter, which could be enabled using an onboard jumper. However, it was only partly register-compatible with CGA.

== Related monitor ==
The PGC's matching display was the IBM 5175, an analog RGB monitor that is unique to it and not compatible with any other video card without modification. With hardware modification, the 5175 can be used with VGA, Macintosh, and various other analog RGB video sources. Some surplus 5175s in VGA-converted form were still sold by catalog retailers such as COMB (Close Out Merchant Buyers) as late as the early 1990s.

== DE-9 video connector ==
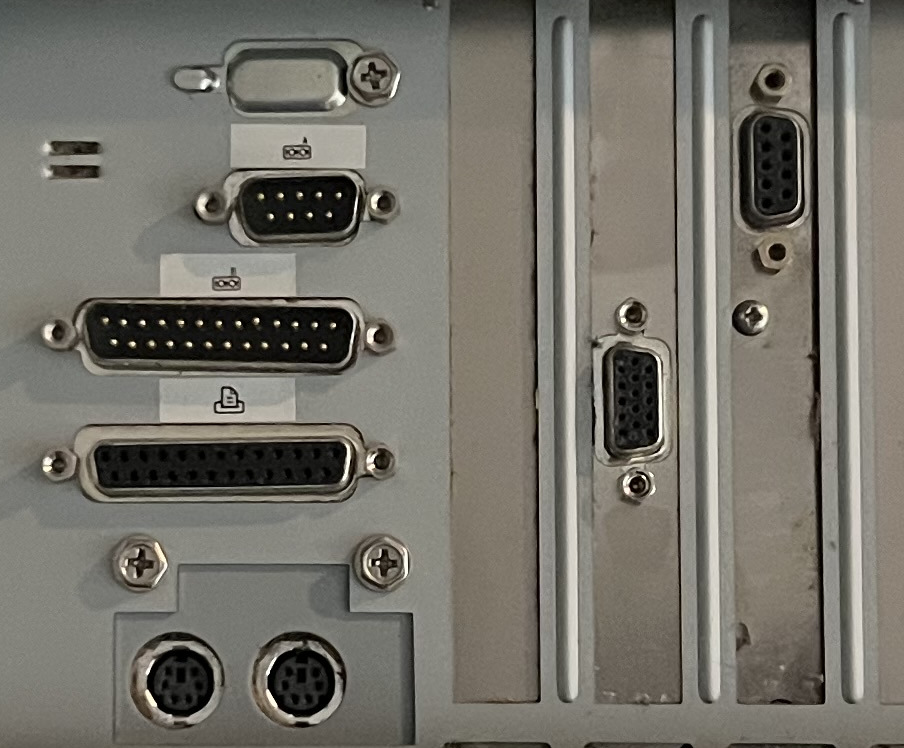
Back of a PC with two video cards that output analog RGB (VGA) signals, one with a 9-pin connector on the right, and the other with a 15-pin connector left of it. Also shown are 9-pin and 25-pin serial ports on the far left, a 25-pin parallel port below them, and PS/2 keyboard and mouse ports.

The DE-9 connector used on the IBM Professional Graphics Controller (PGC) was a 9-pin connector like the Color Graphics Adapter (CGA) and Enhanced Graphics Adapter (EGA) but was otherwise a (would later become) VGA-compatible RGB signal. Significantly, early NEC MultiSync monitors had a 9-pin male port on the back with this pinout. This was used in some early VGA and VGA-compatible hardware because the standard pre-existed VGA. It is also found in some industrial hardware from the era.

This "9-pin VGA" lacks several pins compared to full VGA, which was usually not problematic because the autodetection features supported by those pins only evolved over time, and prior to Windows 95, there was no user expectation of graphics cards and displays being fully plug and play. DE-9 "VGA" connectors generally all used the same pinout, and adapters to the DE-15 standard have been made. Ultimately all VGA hardware makers switched to standard DE-15 connectors, relegating the early variant to relative obscurity.

DE-9 is the same physical size as DE-15, the latter being a high density configuration in the same "E" shell.

PGC/VGA DE-9 connector pin signals
Pin	PGC	VGA de facto
1	Red (R)	Red (R)
2	Green (G)	Green (G) or sync-on-green (Gs) (Note: E.g. the NEC Multisync 1 supported sync-on-green.)
3	Blue (B)	Blue (B)
4	Composite sync (S)	Horizontal (H) or composite sync (S)
5	Mode select	Vertical sync (V)
6	Red return	Red return
7	Green return	Green return
8	Blue return	Blue return
9	Sync ground	Sync ground

== Hardware derivatives ==
- Matrox PG-640, PG-1280, QG-640 (for the DEC MicroVAX), VG-640 (VME)
- Dell NEC MVA-1024 card
- Everex EPGA
- Orchid Technology TurboPGA
- Vermont Microsystems IM-640, IM-1024

== See also ==
- List of defunct graphics chips and card companies
- PC/GX
- Timeline of early 3D computer graphics hardware
