= Dado Banatao =

Filipino businessman and electrical engineer (1946–2025)

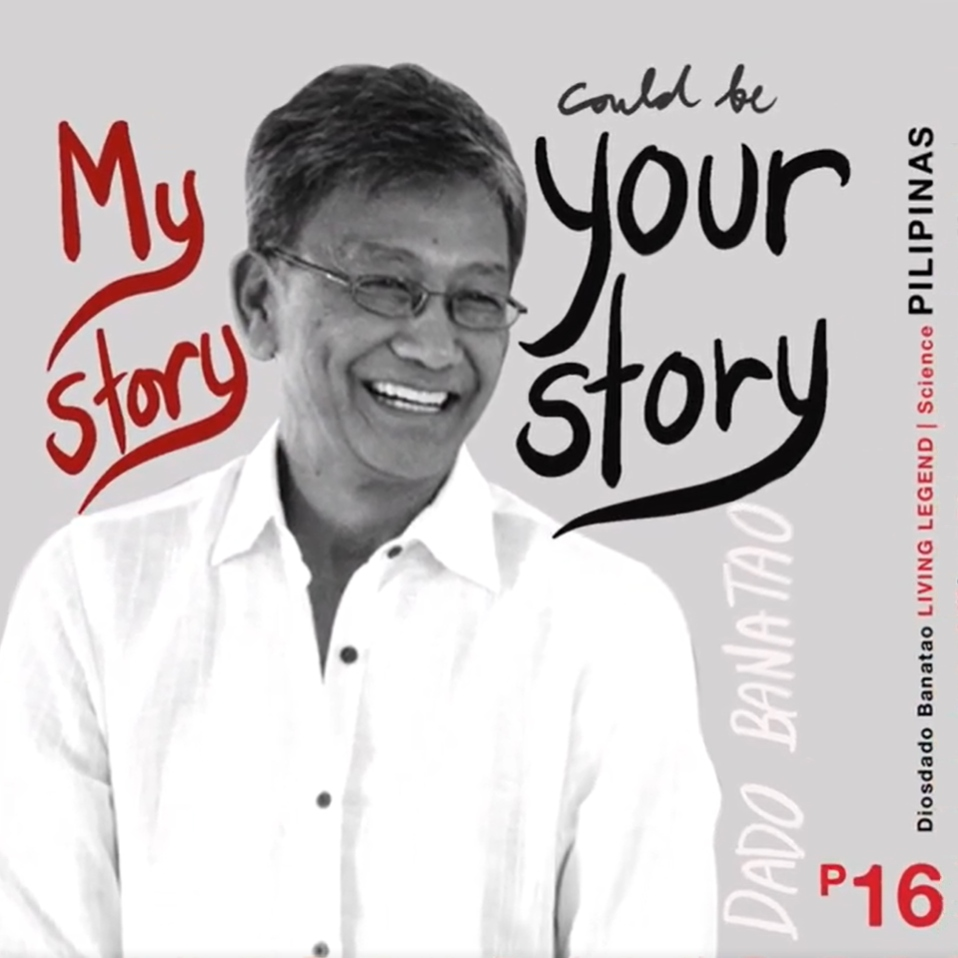
- Banatao on a 2021 Philippine stamp
- Born: Diosdado P. Banatao; May 23, 1946; Iguig, Cagayan, Philippines
- Died: December 25, 2025 (aged 79); Stanford, California, U.S.
- Citizenship: Filipino
- Education: Stanford University (MSEECS); Mapúa Institute of Technology (BSEE); Ateneo de Tuguegarao; Malabbac Elementary School
- Occupations: Founder & Managing Partner of Tallwood Venture Capital, CEO of Ikanos Communications, Chairman of PhilDev Foundation
- Known for: PC chipsets, PHY chips
- Board member of: T-RAM Semiconductor, Inc., Inphi Corporation, Alphion Corporation, Sirf Technology Inc., Quintic Corporation, Wilocity Ltd., Integrated Micro-Electronics
- Spouse: Maria Cariaga
- Parent(s): Salvador and Rosita Banatao

Diosdado P. Banatao (May 23, 1946 – December 25, 2025) was a Filipino businessman and electrical engineer working in the high-tech industry, credited with having developed the first 10-Mbit Ethernet CMOS chip, the first system logic chipset compatible with IBM's PC/XT and the PC/AT, and one of the first GUI accelerators for personal computers. As a three-time start-up veteran, he co-founded Mostron, Chips and Technologies, and S3 Graphics.

== Early life and education ==
Banatao was born in Iguig, Cagayan, Philippines on May 23, 1946. His father, Salvador Banatao, was a rice farmer. His mother, Rosita Banatao, was a housekeeper.

He had a rags-to-riches story. During his childhood, he walked barefoot on a dirt road just to reach Malabbac Elementary School. He pursued his secondary education at the Jesuit-run Ateneo de Tuguegarao. After high school, he pursued his Bachelor of Science in Electrical Engineering from the Mapúa Institute of Technology and graduated cum laude.

== Career ==
After college, he turned down several job offers, including one from Meralco. He joined Philippine Airlines as a trainee pilot, and later joined Boeing. At Boeing, he worked as a design engineer for the company's new commercial airliner and cargo transport aircraft, Boeing 747, in the United States. With the opportunity to stay in the United States, he then took his Master of Science in Electrical Engineering and Computer Science at Stanford University and finished in 1972. Banatao also joined the Homebrew Computer Club, where he met Steve Jobs and Steve Wozniak.

After finishing his master's degree, Banatao worked with different technology companies such as the National Semiconductor, Intersil, and Commodore International. He designed the first single chip, 16-bit microprocessor-based calculator. In 1981, he developed the first 10-Mbit Ethernet CMOS with silicon coupler data-link control and transceiver chip while working in Seeq Technology. He was also credited with the first system logic chipset for IBM's PC/XT and PC/AT, the local bus concept, and one of the first GUI accelerator chips for personal computers.

In 1984, Banatao and his business partner Francis Siu founded the motherboard manufacturing company, Mostron, with US$500,000 in start-up capital; they also hired Ron Yara of Intel as a company executive. After Banatao developed a five-chip chipset compatible with IBM's PC/AT, he co-founded Chips and Technologies (C&T) in 1985. The company developed chipsets compatible with IBM's Personal Computer family, including the PC/AT and the PC/XT. C&T generated $12 million in revenue in its first four months. After 22 months, the company went public. In 1989, Banatao launched his third start-up company, S3 Graphics, with Yara in Santa Clara, California.S3 developed GUI accelerators that enhanced the capabilities of personal computers in rendering graphical user interfaces (GUIs). The key advantage in S3's chips was the implementation of a local bus. The company had an initial public offering of $30 million. By 1996 S3 was the leader of the GUI accelerator market, beating out their strong competitor, Cirrus Logic. In the same year, Chips & Technologies was sold to Intel for about $300 million. In 2000 Banatao decided to start his own venture capital firm named Tallwood Venture Capital with a capital of US$300 million, all of which came out of his own pocket. He later sold another small company, with fewer than 20 employees, for more than $1 billion. Dado was also part of SiRF, one of the first companies to commercialize the GPS after it had been declassified by the United States government.

In 2010, Banatao became Ikanos Communications' CEO after Michael Gulett resigned as the company's CEO and president.

== Philanthropy ==
In the Philippines, Banatao through his Dado Banatao Educational Foundation, annually awards five educational scholarships to intelligent Filipino students who have bright futures in the field of engineering and technology. He also chaired the Philippine Development Foundation, which helps send brilliant young Filipinos to school to help them reach their full potential. PhilDev was spun off from Ayala Foundation's program. Through his Banatao Filipino American Fund, he assisted Californian high school students of Filipino heritage in their pursuit of college education in engineering. He also built a computer center at his grade school in his hometown of Iguig, making it the only public school with the most modern computer network in the Philippines.

== Death ==
On December 25, 2025, Banatao died in Stanford, California due to complications stemming from an undisclosed neurological disorder. He was 79.

== Accolades ==
Awards received by Diosdado Banatao
Year	Awarded by	Award	Category	Result	Source
1993	Asian Business League of San Francisco	Asian Leadership Award		Won	
1997	Philippine President Fidel V. Ramos	Pamana ng Filipino Award		Won	
1997	Ernst & Young, Inc. Magazine, and Merrill Lynch Business Financial Services	Master Entrepreneur of the Year Award		Won	
2011	Search to Involve Pilipino Americans (SIPA)	Kalampusan Award	Corporate Achievement	Won	
2018	JCI Manila and PHINMA Corporation with DLSU RVR College of Business and Asian Institute of Management	Ramon V. Del Rosario Award	Nation Building	Won	
Recognitions received by Diosdado Banatao
Year	Organization		Recognition		Source
1993	National Ethnic Coalition of Organizations, Inc. (NECO)		Ellis Island Medal of Honor		
1994	National Ethnic Coalition of Organizations, Inc. (NECO)		Ellis Island Medal of Honor		
2002	The Forbes Midas List		Rank 49 out of 100		
2003	The Forbes Midas List		Rank 68 out of 100		
2004	The Forbes Midas List		Rank 58 out of 100		
2005	The Forbes Midas List		Rank 42 out of 100		
2006	The Forbes Midas List		Rank 91 out of 100		
2009	Mindanao State University - Iligan Institute of Technology		Doctor of Technology (honoris causa)		
