= SPEA =

Spea or SPEA may refer to:

- Spea, a genus of amphibians
- SpeA, an enzyme also known as arginine decarboxylase
- SPEA (company), an Italian tech company
- School of Public and Environmental Affairs at Indiana University
- Spea Software AG, a defunct German computer graphics hardware company
