= Sanjai Kohli =

Electrical engineer and entrepreneur

Sanjai Kohli is an electrical engineer and entrepreneur known for his work developing consumer Global Positioning System (GPS) receivers. In addition to his recognition for GPS work, he founded multiple startups and is the CEO of MIPS Technologies (Wave Computing). His academic awards include the European Inventor Award and Fellow of the IEEE.

== Work ==
Kohli's work developing a new GPS chip beginning in 1995 eventually led to the creation of the company SiRF, which went public in 2002. After SiRF was later acquired by the British company CSR plc, Kohli's net worth exceeded $50 million according to The Economic Times.

Kohli was appointed as the CEO of Wave Computing in September 2019. He continued as CEO in March 2021, after the company emerged from Chapter 11 bankruptcy.

== Recognition ==
In 2010, Kohli and Steve Chen won the European Inventor Award from the European Patent Office for their invention of the Chen-Kohli GPS chip (called the GPS Spread Spectrum Receiver) in 1995. His contributions led The Times of India to refer to him as "father of mass market GPS". He was named IEEE Fellow in 2012.
