= Actix Systems =

Defunct graphics hardware company

Actix Systems, Inc.
- Industry: Computer
- Founded: 1990; 36 years ago in Santa Clara, California
- Founder: Stephen W. Cheng
- Defunct: 1998; 28 years ago
- Fate: Dissolution
- Products: Graphics adapters
- Number of employees: 27 (1996)

Actix Systems, Inc., was an American graphics adapter manufacturer active from 1990 to 1998 and based in the San Francisco Bay Area. The company was founded by Stephen W. Cheng and initially specialized in a subset of graphics adapters known as GUI accelerators, becoming a major player in the field. Toward the mid-1990s the company began manufacturing more general-purpose adapters under its GraphicsEngine brand.

== History ==
=== Foundation (1990–1992) ===
Actix Systems was founded by Stephen W. Cheng in Santa Clara, California, in 1990. Cheng, born in Chiayi in 1945, graduated from the Texas A&M School of Medicine with an M.D./Ph.D. in the 1970s. He was briefly employed by Mostek in Massachusetts from 1982 to 1983, switching to nearby Wang Laboratories where he was employed to design a digital PBX system. In 1984 he was hired by Lucent Technologies as the lead designer of a fiber-optic communications system, and finally in 1987 he was hired by Digital Equipment Corporation, where he was the program manager of networking. Cheng moved from Massachusetts to California to found Actix Systems, combining his disparate experience in the computer industry to specialize in designing graphics adapters.

The company initially focused on a subset of graphics adapters known as GUI accelerators, which were designed specifically to speed up the drawing of elements in a graphical user interface (GUI) and to enhance its overall visual appearance by increasing the color depth and resolution. Actix was one of the first companies to design products in this field. Their first product was the Tiger 10, released in August 1991 and aimed at corporate users of Microsoft's Windows 3.0. The Tiger 10 shipped with a proprietary device driver for Windows, while the card featured TIGA graphics processors manufactured by Texas Instruments. It supported the standard VGA resolution of 640 by 480 pixels, all the way up to 1280-by-960-pixel Super VGA, with certain display modes possessing a 90 MHz refresh rate. A month later, the company released the Quantum VGA, a GUI accelerator based on S3 Incorporated's 86C911 chipset. The Quantum VGA was received warmly in InfoWorld, where reviewer Jim Canning wrote that the board offered "major relief to beleaguered 80286s and 80386SXes". Actix followed up the Quantum VGA with the HiColor Spectra Board, a consumer-oriented, general-purpose graphics adapter based on Tseng Labs' ET 4000 chip that boosted the standard VGA color depth from 256 colors to 32,768, owing to a Sierra RAMDAC on board.

=== GraphicsEngine line (1992–1998) ===
In January 1992, Actix introduced the first two models in its long line of GraphicsEngine adapters. Called the GraphicsEngine VGA, they were also based on S3's GUI accelerator chip and comprised two models: one with 512 KB of video RAM, and another with 1 MB. The former supported up to a 1024-by-768-pixel resolution with 4-bit color depth, while the latter supported up to a 1280-by-960-pixel resolution with 8-bit color depth. In March 1992, the company introduced the GraphicsEngine Display Accelerator, which incorporated the same RAMDAC as the HiColor Spectra, allowing the board to display 16-bit color at a 1280-by-1024-pixel resolution. Both boards received mixed assessments in PC Magazine, while InfoWorld rated the GraphicsEngine Display Accelerator the fastest board on the low-end of the GUI accelerator market.

By the end of 1993, Actix had moved to a larger office in Santa Clara, which housed its 20 employees (up from 10 in 1992). The company was described by Transpacific magazine as protective of the details of their operations, only divulging that they posted $9 million in sales in 1993.

The company introduced their first VESA Local Bus product with the GraphicsEngine 32VL in mid-1993. The VESA Local Bus was a motherboard technology that allowed expansion cards to access the memory bus of Intel's i486 processor directly, breaking the bottleneck of the antiquated but still commonplace Industry Standard Architecture bus and allowing for much-accelerated graphics output. Actix followed up with its first two products based on the Peripheral Component Interconnect (PCI) bus, the GraphicsEngine 64 PCI and GraphicsEngine Ultra 64 PCI, in 1994. PCI was an entirely new motherboard bus standard invented by Intel; it had much higher bandwidth than both ISA and VESA Local Bus and eventually came to dominate the motherboard landscape in the mid-1990s.

One of the company's last products was the GraphicsEngine Ultra AV in 1995. Powered by S3's Vision968 graphics chipset and a Texas Instruments RAMDAC, it could display graphics at up to a 1600-by-1200-pixel resolution. The company coasted through 1996 with $17 million in annual sales. By this point the company had moved again to Sunnyvale, California, and employed 27 workers. Actix in 1997 planned a pivot to providing video conferencing products for enterprises. These plans did not pan out for the company, however, and in 1998 Actix petitioned to dissolve in the state of California.
