= Orchid Graphics Adapter =

Graphics board for IBM PC compatibles, released in 1982 by Orchid Technology

- Release date: 1982; 43 years ago

Cards
- Entry-level: Orchid Graphics Adapter

History
- Predecessor: MDA

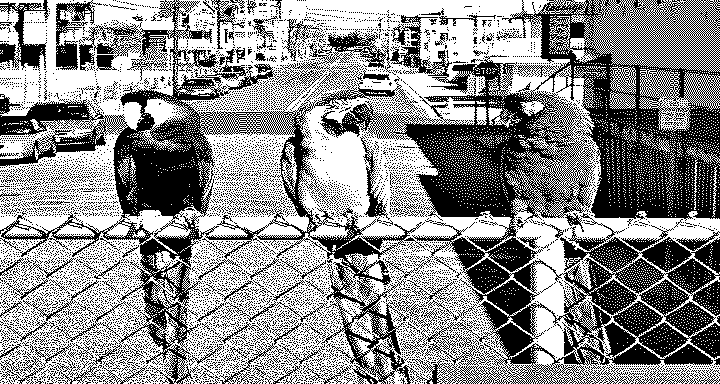
Simulated Orchid Graphics Adapter image without aspect ratio correction

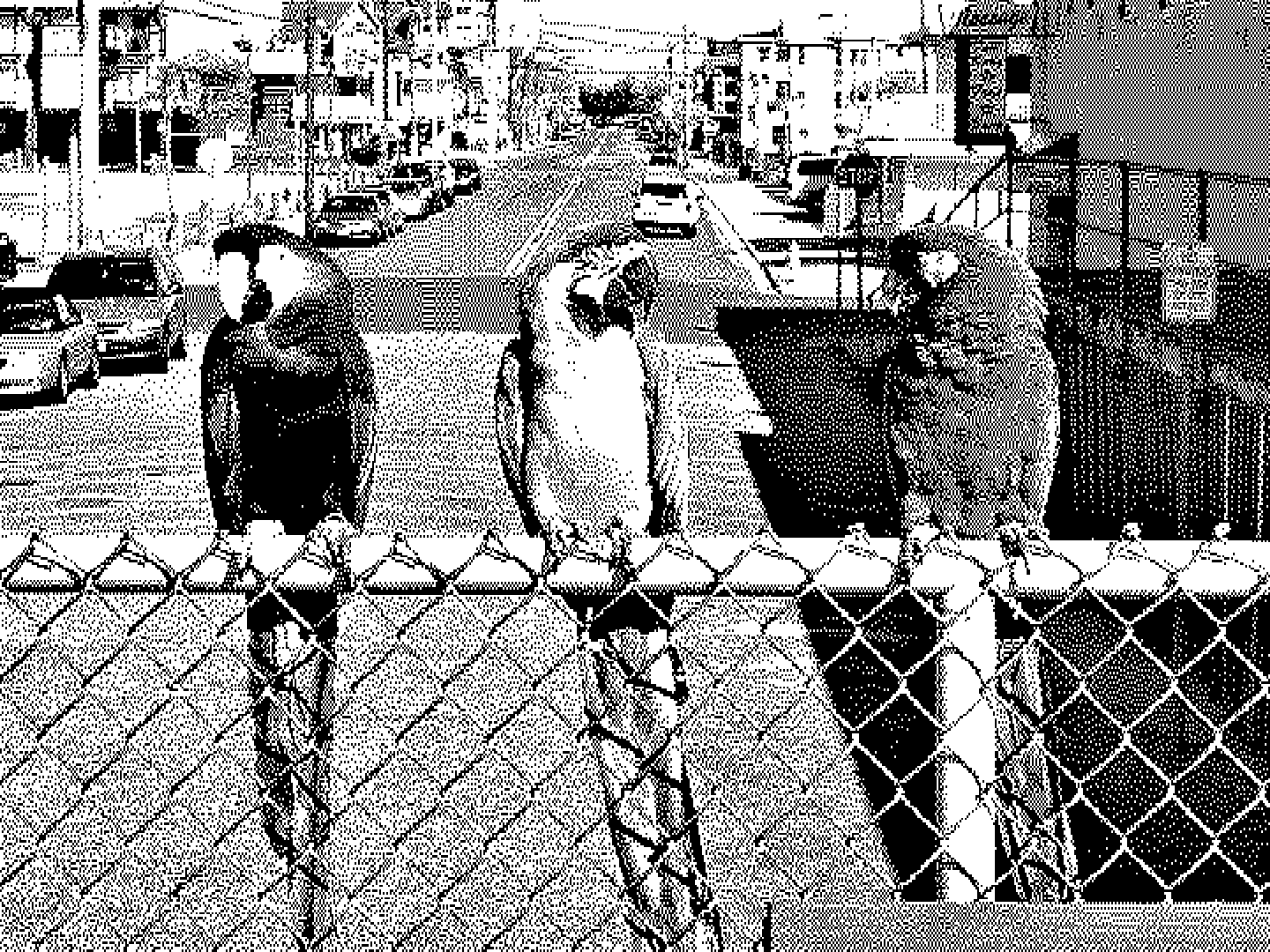
Simulated Orchid Graphics Adapter image with correct aspect ratio as would be seen on a 4:3 monitor

The Orchid Graphics Adapter is a graphics board for IBM PC compatible computers, released in 1982 by Orchid Technology.

It was intended to provide high resolution (at the time) monochrome graphic abilities to computers limited to text displays. It was aimed at the business market and one of the three first third party graphic boards for PCs (the others being Plantronics Colorplus and Hercules Graphics Card).

It offered a monochrome 720 × 350 pixel resolution (similar to Hercules Graphics Card) and required an existing MDA board to function. The board also offered an IBM PC joystick adapter.

No software, other than GSX-86 and that supplied with the board (Dr. Halo by Media Cybernetics), offered support for the hardware. Graphic routines could be called from FORTRAN, PASCAL or IBM BASIC.

== Output capabilities ==
- 720 × 350 monochrome graphics, pixel aspect ratio of 1:1.55.

== See also ==
- Plantronics Colorplus
- Hercules Graphics Card
- IBM Monochrome Display Adapter
