= Video Seven =

Defunct American graphics hardware company

Video Seven, Inc.
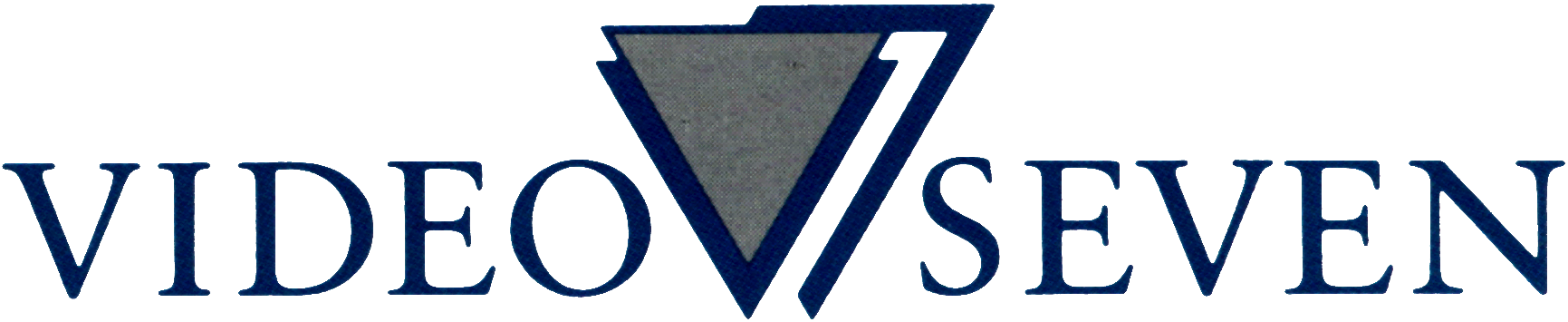
- Type: Private (1982–1987); Public (1987–1989); Subsidiary (1989–1993)
- Industry: Computer
- Founded: 1984; 42 years ago in Milpitas, California
- Founder: Paul Jain
- Defunct: 1989; 37 years ago
- Fate: Merged with G-2 Inc. in 1989 to form Headland Technology, itself acquired by Computer Visualization Technologies, Inc.; dissolved in 1993
- Products: Video controllers; Graphics adapter cards

Video Seven, Inc., also typeset as Video-7 and abbreviated as V7, was a public American computer hardware company independently active from 1984 to 1989. The company manufactured expansion cards for personal computers, mainly graphics cards for the IBM PC through their Vega brand. It was founded by Paul Jain as his second venture in the graphics card market; after his departure in 1990, he founded Media Vision. Video Seven delivered both the first graphics card compatible with IBM's Enhanced Graphics Adapter (EGA), in 1985, and one of the first cards compatible with IBM's Video Graphics Array (VGA) standard, in 1987. At its peak, it was one of the three largest global manufacturers of graphics hardware for the IBM PC. In 1989, Video Seven merged with G-2 Inc., a subsidiary of LSI Logic Corporation, becoming Headland Technology, Inc., which folded in 1993.

== History ==
=== Foundation (1984–1987) ===
Video Seven, Inc. was founded by Paul Jain in Milpitas, California, in 1984. Before starting Video Seven, Jain had been the founder of Paradise Systems, another graphics card manufacturer that was an early vendor in the IBM Personal Computer market. Jain served as Paradise's CEO for two years until April 1984, when he founded Video Seven, his second venture in the graphics card market. Jain would remain on Paradise's boardroom until 1987, after Paradise was acquired by Western Digital.

Video Seven's first product was announced in August 1984 for the Apple IIc. Called the RGB Interface, it was a converter box roughly the size of a pack of cigarettes that connected to the IIc's DB-15 Video Expansion port on the back, adapting its output to graphical RGBI video. This allowed for much higher quality output than the stock composite output of the IIc was capable of achieving. The RGB Interface only worked with certain RGBI color monitors meant for the earlier Apple III microcomputer. However, combined with Video Seven's second product, the Grappler, users could connect the IIc and the RGB Interface to any standard IBM Personal Computer monitor. In late 1984, Video Seven licensed the technologies behind the RGB Interface to Sakata U.S.A. Corporation, who released the XP-7, an expansion card for the Apple IIe that allowed it to connect to RGBI monitors. Video Seven made $1.8 million in sales from these products in their first year. The company released their last Apple II product in September 1985, after which the company began focusing on products for the IBM PC.

Over the summer of 1985, Video Seven formed a joint venture with Chips and Technologies (C&T) to develop the first clone of IBM's Enhanced Graphics Adapter (EGA). C&T at the time had only been in business for several months, as a startup company in the IBM PC graphics chipset market. Their efforts came to fruition in early December 1985; branded the Vega, not only was it the first EGA clone board, it was also the first EGA board to feature support for the four major video modes that IBM PC software supported: MDA, CGA, and Hercules (on top of EGA). Despite supporting so many video modes, the Vega card was half the length of IBM's EGA card and cost roughly half of what IBM charged at the time. It was a critical and commercial success, Video Seven selling 300,000 units of the Vega and its successor, the Vega Deluxe, through to October 1987. Shortly before the original Vega's release, in early December 1985, Quadram Corporation purchased a large stake in Video Seven, expressing interest in using its technology in an EGA-compatible board of theirs. The result of their partnership was the Quad EGA+, a full-length version of the Vega that was otherwise identical in functionality.

The Vega Deluxe, introduced in October 1986, extended the EGA standard to include 640-by-480-pixel and 752-by-410-pixel color graphics modes. These new modes represent roughly 37-percent increases over the highest color resolution supported by stock EGA (640-by-350-pixels). These modes were only usable with certain expensive multimode monitors, however.

=== Growth (1987–1989) ===
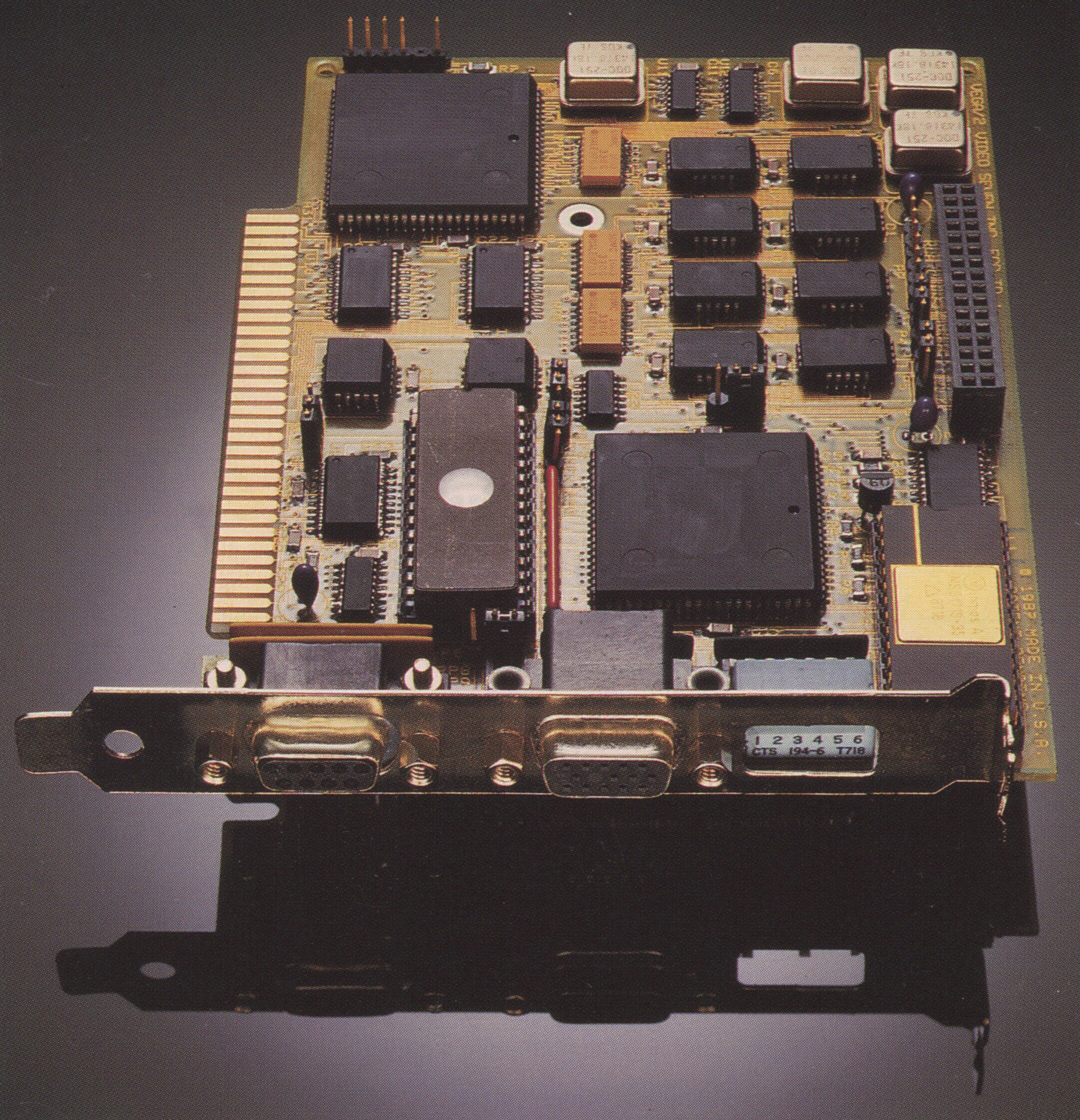
The Vega VGA, introduced in September 1987, was Video Seven's first VGA-compatible card.

Increasing sales of Vega boards made Video Seven one of the three largest global manufacturers of IBM PC expansion cards. Their largest competitors at the time included Jain's former Paradise Systems and Hercules Computer Technology. In 1987 alone, Video Seven earned a $2.8 million profit on sales of $34.3 million. Its steady growth prompted Video Seven to file to go public in October that year.

In September 1987, Video Seven announced the first VGA-compatible card, the Vega VGA, for an October release. This was six months after IBM launched Video Graphics Array (VGA), their next-generation video graphics standard, in April 1987 with the IBM PS/2, the intended successor to their IBM PC model line. Unlike their earlier PCs, the PS/2 had the video circuitry located on the motherboard; as well, they redesigned the bus with the PS/2 to an incompatible standard they dubbed Micro Channel. On its announcement, Video Seven proclaimed the Vega VGA to be the first graphics card that was hardware-compatible with VGA for ISA machines (ISA being the bus of the IBM PC and its clones). Earlier contenders from Sigma Designs and STB Systems, released in the summer of 1987, came with software utilities to draw Mode 13h graphics but which lacked the ability to render VGA graphics in other higher-resolution modes. While the Vega VGA may have been the first VGA-compatible ISA board, on launch it suffered from some incompatibility with popular software, such as Windows/386 and its virtual 8086 mode. Compaq's Video Graphics Controller Board, released in November 1987, is thus credited by PC Magazine as the first fully compatible VGA card for ISA machines.

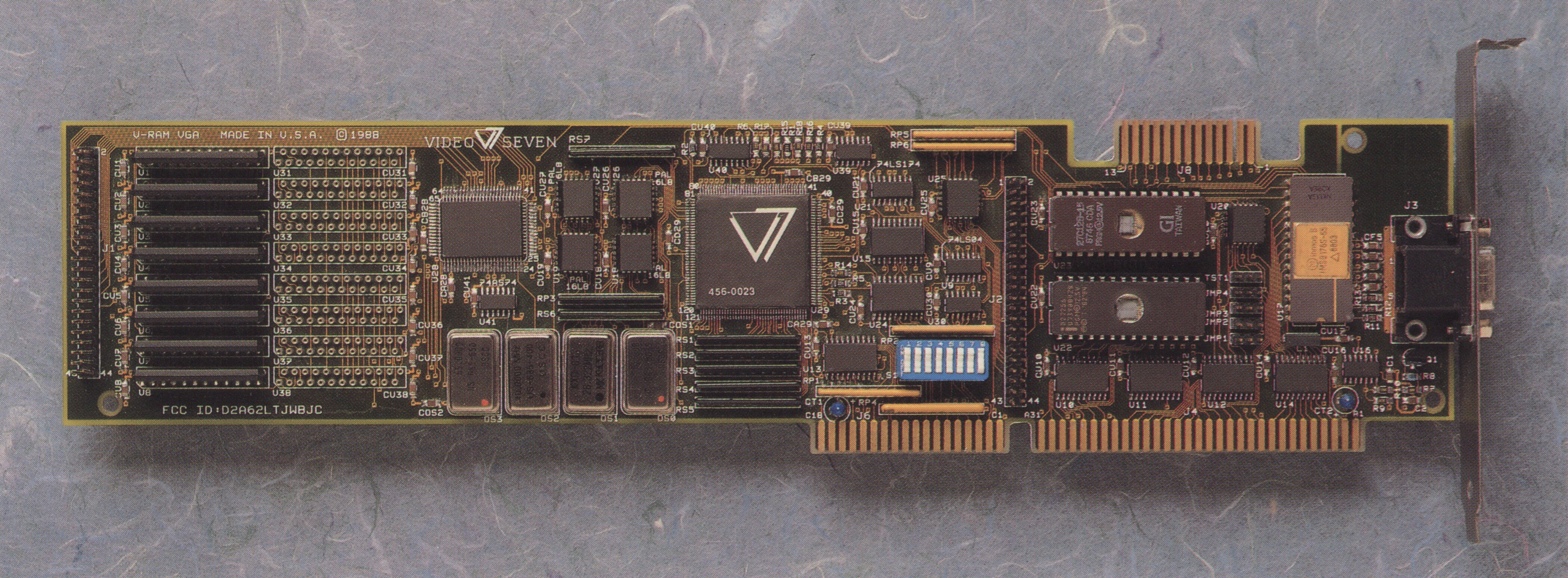
The VRAM VGA was the first VGA card on the market to include video RAM.

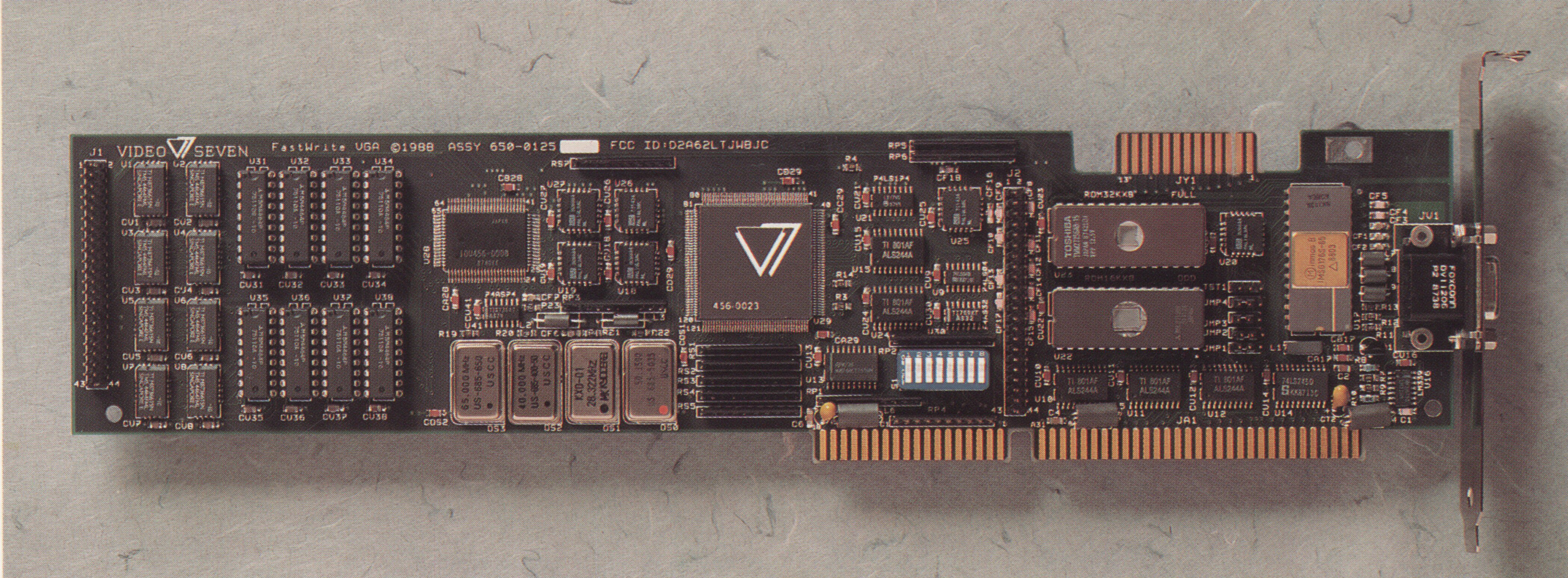
Released alongside the VRAM VGA, the FastWrite VGA uses conventional dynamic RAM.

In August 1988, Video Seven shipped two new VGA-compatbile boards: the FastWrite and the VRAM VGA. Both chips feature the company's then-new V7VGA chipset, which clocks faster than most of its contemporaneous competitors and incorporates cache memory to improve graphical performance. Whereas the FastWrite relies on conventional dynamic RAM in tandem with the cache to achieve modest improvements in performance over the competition, the VRAM VGA uses dedicated video RAM (VRAM) to achieve large gains in performance through being dual-ported, allowing the processor to execute program code while the VRAM works in tandem with the graphics chipset to draw to the screen simultaneously. The VRAM VGA was the first VGA graphics card on the market to incorporate VRAM, allowing it to outperform IBM's own ISA-based PS/2 Display Adapter. InfoWorld wrote that the VRAM VGA board represented "the cutting edge of VGA technology", with speed improvements in Microsoft Word chart editing representing "the first time in our VGA testing" the magazine found "a significant speed difference" in that benchmark, when comparing the FastWrite and V-RAM to several of its competitors.

=== Acquisition and decline (1989–1993) ===
In October 1988, LSI Logic Corporation, a large stakeholder in Video Seven, acquired a majority stake in the company after acquiring all of the shares belonging to Intelligent Systems, the owners of Quadram. Their stake increased from 20 percent to 70 percent. In April 1989, Video Seven merged with LSI subsidiary G-2 Inc. to form Headland Technology, retaining the Video Seven brand for future video cards. LSI reportedly spent $50 million on the acquisition. Jain sold his stakes as part of the acquisition and shortly thereafter formed Media Vision, a vendor of multimedia expansion cards, in 1990.

Video Seven continued to compete in the high-end video graphics marketplace until 1992, when LSI Logic sold Headland to Computer Visualization Technologies, Inc. (CVTI), of Fremont, California, a subsidiary of Germany-based Spea Software AG. Headland had been suffering from executive churn and market disinterest in the last few years of its existence under LSI Logic. CVTI struggled with the Video Seven division themselves and shuttered it in 1993. They continued to sell multimedia peripherals such as sound and graphics cards with the Video Seven trademark into 1995, until Spea themselves were purchased by Diamond Multimedia in November 1995.

=== Trademark revival (1997–2009) ===
Logo of the revived Videoseven

In the late 1990s, Macrotron AG acquired the rights to the Video Seven trademark from Diamond Multimedia and revived it as a brand of computer monitors in Europe, under the new stylization Videoseven. In 1998, Ingram Micro acquired a majority stake in Macrotron and made it a subsidiary of the company's Munich branch, renaming it to Ingram Macrotron AG. Ingram Macrotron continued using the Videoseven trademark in Europe for computer monitors and other computer peripherals. Beginning in 2007, they began using the name in consumer electronics sold in the United States, including portable and dashboard GPS units, among other devices. This was the first time since 1995 that the Video Seven name saw use in the United States. Ingram would continue marketing products under the Videoseven trademark until mid-2009.

== See also ==
- List of defunct graphics chips and card companies
