= Vectrix Corporation =

- Type: Private
- Industry: Computer
- Founded: 1980; 46 years ago in Greensboro, North Carolina
- Founder: Richard Katz
- Defunct: 1993; 33 years ago
- Products: VX series; Pepe

Vectrix Corporation was a manufacturer of high-resolution color computer graphics products. Formed in 1980 by Richard Katz, the company's first products were the VX family of graphics terminals, followed by the Pepe graphics cards for the IBM XT and AT.

== VX series ==
The VX Graphics Processor series of terminals, launched in 1983, were available in two models, the VX128 and VX384. Both produced a display of 672×480 pixels. The primary difference between the two was the size of the framebuffer; the VX128 contained 128 kB of RAM which held 3 bitplanes to allow a total of 8 colors in a single image, selected from a fixed palette, while the VX384's 384 kB held 9 bitplanes for a total of 512 colors per image selected from a user-defined palette selected from 24-bit values for 16.8 million possible colors.

The VX machines were driven by an Intel 8086, making it more powerful than most of the computers it would connect to. Connections to the host were made over a Centronics port, or alternately a RS-232 port with a maximum speed of 19,200 bit/s. The terminal connected to a color monitor using two sets of BNC connectors, one each for Red, Green and Blue, and then one each for horizontal sync, vertical sync and a combined sync. Another Centronix port was provided for printer output. The terminals could be equipped with two sets of ROM systems; one contained 2D drawing routines, while the second provided 3D.

Images were displayed by sending the system short text commands, typically one or two letters followed by numeric values. For instance, D 250 350 would draw a single pixel ('D'ot) at location (250,350). Typical drawing commands included Dot, Line, Arc, and so forth. For 3D diagrams, there were commands to Scale the drawing (zoom), Rotate it, and set the Viewport parameters. Text could be output using the $tring command.

The current drawing color was set with the Color command, followed by a 16-bit value. In the case of the VX128, the color palette was fixed, with eight pre-defined colors. In the VX384 the color values were held in registers that could be changed by the user by writing RBG values to them using the Q command. This meant that programs could not run on both; blue on the VX128 was value 4, while on the VX384 it was 448.

Although designed for general CAD and other 3D graphics use, the VX series was mostly used in weather forecasting to produce output graphics that were used for television broadcasting. About 50 or 60 systems were used in this fashion. Similar systems using S-100 bus computers and MicroAngelo boards, or the Datamax UV-1, found similar use for weather graphics in the 1980s. After that time the typical IBM PC began to offer comparable output.

== Pepe ==
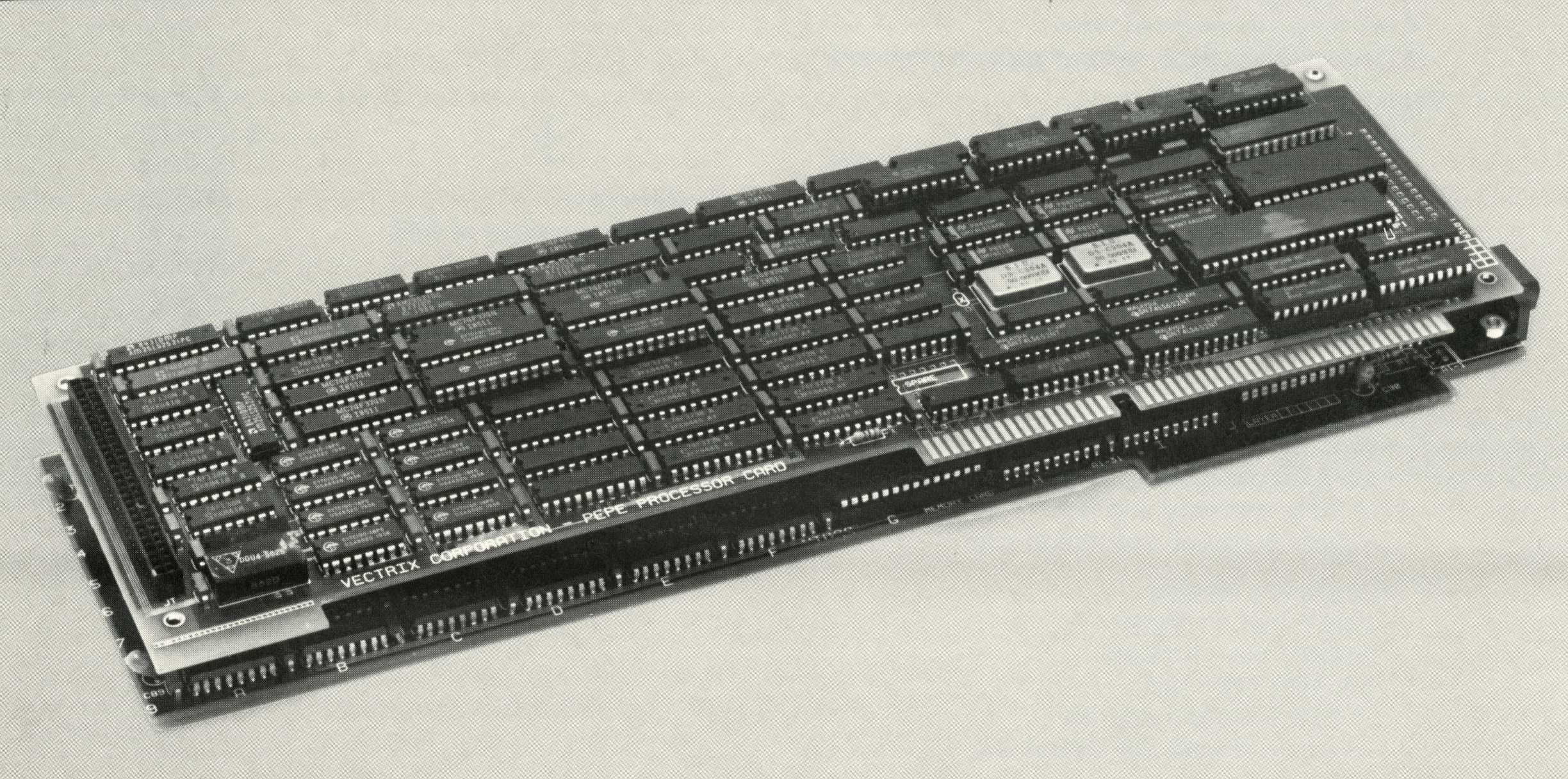
Photograph of a Vectrix Pepe card

In the early 1980s, IBM began their MIDAS project to develop a higher resolution graphics system for the PC compared to the 320×240 Color Graphics Adapter. Vectrix entered a system known as Pepe, but lost out to another development that was taken on by IBM as the Professional Graphics Controller.

Pepe was essentially a version of the VX system reduced in size to fit onto two printed circuit boards that would fit into ISA slots. It supported the improved throughput of the IBM AT bus, and Vectrix recommended this over machines with the original PC bus. Resolution increased to 1024×1024, but the system was otherwise similar to the VX, and operated in the same way. Because the Pepe was not supported by the BIOS, it had to be connected to a separate monitor, using another graphics adaptor for system operation.

Like the VX, Pepe was offered in a variety of sub-versions with different capabilities mostly differing in the amount of memory and color support. The Pepe found some level of support, especially in the CAD market, but the presence of the "official" high-end card from IBM and the increasing sophistication of consumer-oriented cards like VGA rendered this niche obsolete by the late 1980s.
