= GALAX =

Hong Kong computer hardware manufacturer

Galaxy Microsystems
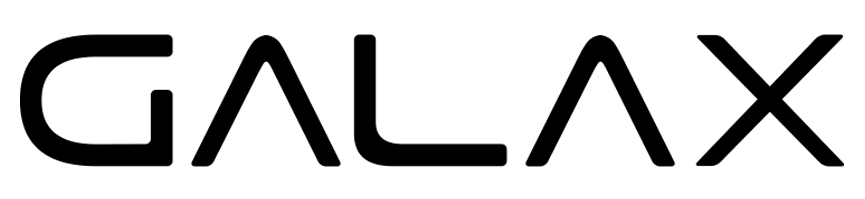
- Trade name: GALAX
- Native name: 影馳科技
- Romanized name: Yǐngchí kējì
- Type: Division
- Industry: Electronics
- Founded: August 1994
- Defunct: April 29, 2026
- Headquarters: Unit 1, 16/F Exchange Twr 33 Wang Chiu Rd, Kowloon Bay, Kowloon, Hong Kong
- Key people: Alex Lam (CEO)
- Products: Computer hardware
- Parent: Palit Microsystems
- Website: www.galax.com

Galaxy Microsystems (GALAX; simplified Chinese: 影驰; traditional Chinese: 影馳; pinyin: Yǐngchí) is a computer hardware manufacturer founded in 1994 and based in Hong Kong. The company specialises in producing video cards, gaming monitors, solid-state drives, memory modules, computer coolers, and other computer accessories.

== Overview ==
Galaxy Technologies was founded in August 1994 as Galaxytech. Galaxy had become one of the NVIDIA AIC partner in 1999. It was acquired by Palit Microsystems in 2008. In 2011, Galaxy launched the Hall Of Fame (HOF) product line, which designed for overclocking enthusiasts and hardcore gamers. In 2013, Galaxy Microsystems changed its trademark name to GALAX. GALAX has factories in Shenzhen, China.
