= Gainward =

Computer hardware company

Gainward Co., Ltd.
- Company type: Private
- Industry: Computer hardware
- Founded: 1984; 42 years ago
- Headquarters: Taipei, Taiwan (Headquarters); Munich, Germany (European HQ)
- Area served: Worldwide
- Products: Graphics cards
- Number of employees: 20 (European HQ)
- Parent: Palit Microsystems
- Website: www.gainward.com

Gainward Co., Ltd., is a computer hardware company which has produced video cards since 1984. Taiwan-based TNC Industrial sold the company to Palit Microsystems in 2005, acquiring the Gainward brand and branch Gainward Europe GmbH for $1 million.

== Product families ==
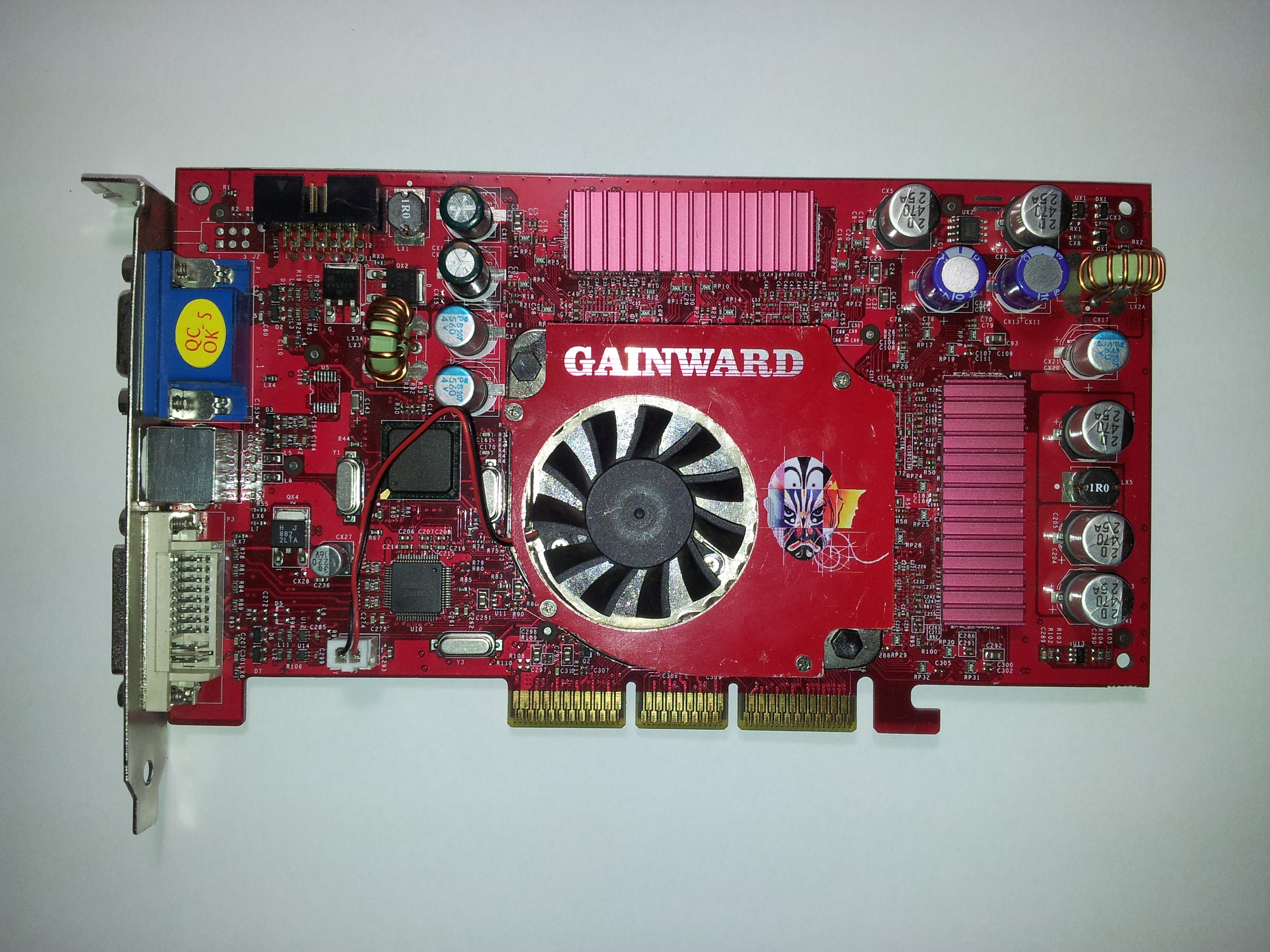
Gainward GeForce4 Ti4800SE AGP graphics card

Their graphic cards used to be exclusively based on Nvidia chipsets; however, the company also announced ATI-based graphics solutions after the successful launch of ATI 4800-series hardware, although Gainward does not currently produce any cards from the ATI Radeon range.

Gainward have had success with their Phantom series of graphic cards, featuring removable fans.
