= Vermont Microsystems =

American computer hardware manufacturer

Vermont Microsystems, Inc.
- Type: Private
- Industry: Computer hardware
- Founded: 1980; 46 years ago in Winooski, Vermont, United States
- Founder: Doug Johns; James Richards; Claude Domingue
- Defunct: c. 2000; 26 years ago
- Fate: Dissolved
- Key people: Peter C. Reed, CEO and president
- Number of employees: 110 (1986, peak)

Vermont Microsystems, Inc. (VMI), was an American computer company based in Winooski, Vermont, and active from 1980 to around 2000. It sold high-end graphics adapters for the IBM PC and compatibles. The company is best known for designing the Professional Graphics Controller (PGC) for IBM in 1984. Later on, it developed enhancement software for AutoCAD, which became the subject of a landmark legal case regarding trade secret infringement in the 1990s.

== History ==
=== Foundation and partnership with IBM (1980–1990) ===
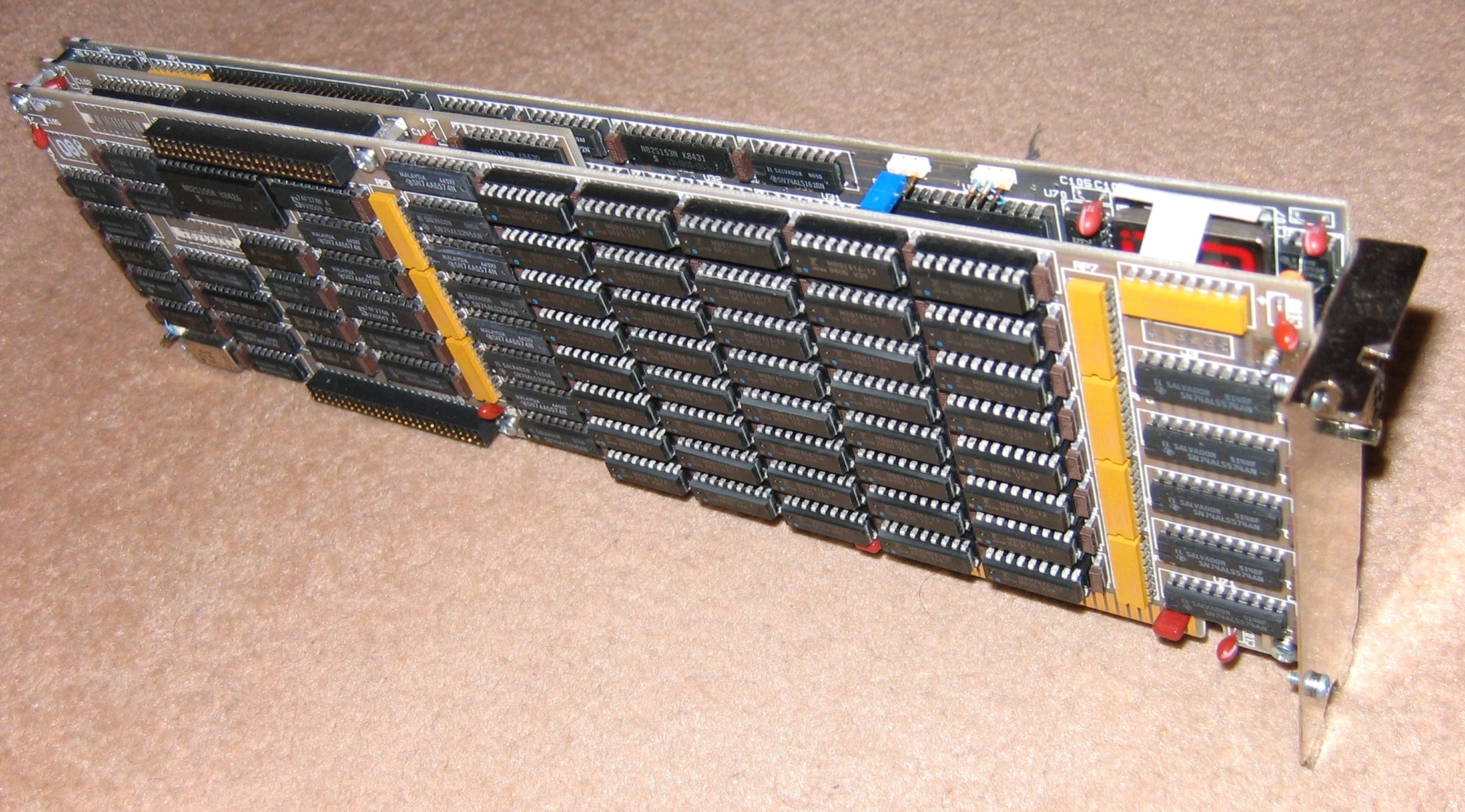
The Professional Graphics Controller, designed by VMI for IBM

Vermont Microsystems, Inc., was founded in 1980 in Winooski, Vermont, by James Richards and Claude Domingue. Both men were former employees of IBM through their Microelectronics division in Essex Junction, Vermont. VMI initially operated as a subcontractor for various original equipment manufacturers; some of its early clients included General Motors and Allen-Bradley.

In 1983, VMI won a competitive bid to develop IBM's next-generation graphics adapter for the IBM PC. Their partnership resulted in a specialized graphics adapter, the Professional Graphics Controller (PGC), that allowed the PC to run CAD/CAM software in high resolution (up to 640 by 480 pixels) and color depth (up to 256 colors from a palette of 4096). Such functionality was previously the exclusive domain of dedicated graphical workstations, which cost thousands of US dollars more. The PGC was principally designed by Curtis Priem, then a recent hire of VMI who later co-founded Nvidia in 1993. While IBM initially only wanted VMI to design the PGC while leaving manufacturing to IBM, Richards refused to agree to the bid unless IBM also allowed VMI to manufacture the cards as well. In a move described as uncharacteristic by The Wall Street Journal, IBM agreed to these terms. The PGC was released in mid-1984 to high praise in the technology press.

VMI's partnership with IBM propelled the former's annual revenue from $1.5 million to over $18 million within two years. In late 1985, VMI sold 90 percent of its PCB manufacturing assemblies to IBM in an attempt to pivot back to subcontracting computer hardware. Although their partnership with IBM was initially successful for VMI, the company's heavy reliance on IBM as a major customer fomented financial instability, however, when sales of the PGC failed to meet IBM's projections. IBM broke up their partnership with VMI in 1986 after shifting to in-house development of its graphics adapters. The subsequent loss of orders from IBM left VMI with high overhead costs, including a 110-person workforce and a 25,000-square-foot facility, but a critical lack of working capital. For roughly a year and a half, the firm faced severe cash flow issues as traditional banks refused to lend money due to a lack of collateral, while venture capital firms were wary of the company's lack of products in development that were ready to market. This period of stagnation led to a reduction in staff and a buildup of debt. Faced with Chapter 11 bankruptcy, Richards and Domingue eventually corralled eight investment banks to supply VMI with a $5.75-million capital infusion in late 1986.

As part of the recapitalization, VMI's principals agreed to restructure the company's leadership. Charles Dickenson, formerly the president of Dataproducts, a major manufacturer of peripherals for mainframe computers, was appointed chairman and chief executive officer of VMI. While Richards retained his role as president and a seat on the board of directors, Domingue departed from the company's management. In December 1986, VMI introduced an enhanced version of the PGC, the Image Manager 1024 (IM-1024), supporting a maximum resolution of 1024 by 800 pixels at 256 colors from a palette of 4096. It also introduced a PGC workalike, the Image Manager 640 (IM-640), featuring an equivalent image resolution and color depth as the original PGC. Also in December 1986 Peter C. Reed, formerly an executive of AM General, was named president and chief financial officer of VMI. He later replaced Dickenson as chairman and CEO.

=== Vermont Microsystems, Inc. v. Autodesk, Inc. (1990–2000) ===
In the mid-1990s, VMI became the central figure in a landmark legal case regarding trade secret infringement and the emerging field of computer forensics. In 1990, VMI introduced AutoMate/Pro, a combination software enhancement package and graphics accelerator card for Autodesk's AutoCAD that was designed to improve its performance on the Windows operating system. AutoMate/Pro sold well for VMI and soon became its flagship product. Following the resignation of an esteemed employee who later joined Autodesk in San Rafael, California, AutoCAD released a software update that integrated many of the features previously exclusive to VMI's AutoMate/Pro line, jeopardizing VMI's bottom line.

Suspecting theft of the company's intellectual property, Reed launched a lawsuit against Autodesk in October 1993. During discovery, it was determined that the employee had attempted to wipe the hard drive of his workstation at VMI before his departure. The deletion process failed to erase the directory structure, however, and investigators compared the filenames and metadata from the original workstation with those on the employee's new workstation at Autodesk. The high degree of similarity between the directory structures served as critical evidence, demonstrating that proprietary information had indeed been copied. In Vermont Microsystems, Inc. v. Autodesk, Inc., the U.S. District Court for the District of Vermont awarded VMI a $25.5 million judgement, the largest award of damages awarded by a Vermont state or federal court up to that point in time in December 1994 (equivalent to $55 million in 2025).

To Reed's chagrin, VMI was unable to secure an injunction preventing Autodesk from selling the current version of AutoCAD containing the infringing lines of code, as the judge in Vermont found that the punitive compensation was adequate by itself. A second blow came in 1997, after VMI's judgement was reduced to $8.4 million (equivalent to $17 million in 2025). The legal victory ultimately failed to prevent the decline of VMI's market share, and following years of litigation and subsequent appeals, VMI ceased active operations, transitioning into a shell company. By 1998, VMI's activities were reduced to the management of the lawsuit and the pursuit of settlement proceeds, with Reed remaining as the sole employee. VMI was fully defunct by 2000.
