= Micronics =

American computer company

Micronics Computers, Inc.
- Company type: Public
- Industry: Computers
- Founded: November 1986; 39 years ago in Mountain View, California, United States
- Founders: Frank Lin; Dean Chang; Harvey Wong; Minsiu Huang
- Defunct: July 1998; 27 years ago
- Fate: Acquired by Diamond Multimedia
- Headquarters: Fremont, California (1991–1998)
- Products: Motherboards; Computer systems; Peripherals
- Number of employees: 215 (1991)

Micronics Computers, Inc. was an American computer company active from 1986 to 1998 that manufactured complete systems, motherboards, and peripherals. Based in the San Francisco Bay Area, Micronics was one of the largest domestic motherboard manufacturers in the United States in the 1990s. After acquiring Orchid Technology in 1994, the company entered the market for multimedia products, such as graphics adapters and sound cards. In 1998, Micronics was acquired by Diamond Multimedia.

== History ==
=== Foundation and growth (1986–1992) ===
Micronics Computers was founded by Frank Lin, Dean Chang, Harvey Wong, and Minsiu Huang, four Taiwan-American electronics engineers and businessmen in Mountain View, California, in November 1986. Lin and Chang were the company's principal founders, the company originally based out of Lin's home garage in San Francisco. The two set out to found Micronics as an OEM vendor of IBM PC compatible motherboards for systems integrators to buy in bulk. While devoting their free time to developing Micronics as a side venture, Lin worked at TeleVideo in San Jose, while Chang worked at Silicon Compilers, another Silicon Valley hardware company. After Lin's neighbors complained of electromagnetic interference affecting the reception of their television sets, he and Chang contacted Wong and Huang, and the four pooled together $150,000 to formally incorporate Micronics in Mountain View. The company's first headquarters were a 400-square-foot office in the city. Their first products were motherboards based on Intel's 80286 and i386 processors. Micronics' i386-based motherboard in particular was closely based on that of Compaq's Deskpro 386 system. According to PC Week, it was the least-expensive i386 motherboard on the market at the time; they rated it a good value in terms of performance and expandability.

Through their work contacts and after advertising in newspaper classifieds, Micronics was able to find customers for their motherboards, and in early 1987, the company received a $250,000 from several private investors based in the United States and Taiwan. The company sold $4 million worth of motherboards within nine months of their founding, netting $170,000 in profit. In 1989, the company released their first motherboard based on the Extended Industry Standard Architecture (EISA) bus, which was devised by the so-called Gang of Nine consortium (led by Compaq) as an open-standard competitor to IBM's Micro Channel. In 1990, Micronics announced its first i486-based motherboards and received an additional $5 million in capital investments from companies in the United States, Hong Kong, and Japan.

Micronics by early 1991 had moved to a larger office in Fremont, California, where they employed 215 people. The company projected revenues of nearly $100 million for 1991. In January 1991, the company announced their first family of X terminals at the UniForum show in Dallas, Texas. Called the 3X and 4X, Micronics' terminals respectively featured i386 and i486 processors and could double as MS-DOS workstations. The terminals featured bespoke X Window System server software developed by the company. In August 1991, Micronics made a deal with Alpha Microsystems of Santa Ana to supply the latter with $4 million worth of computer system components. Simultaneously, Micronics released its first portable computer, the Mport 325. Featuring a laptop-esque clamshell design while lacking a battery, the Mport 325 featured an i386 processor clocked at 25 MHz and a 6.9-inch-diagonal monochrome LCD.

=== Executive churn and Orchid acquisition (1992–1995) ===
Micronics went public in 1991. Co-founder Huang took a sabbatical from late 1991 to mid-1992, rejoining the board of directors around the same time president and CEO Lin announced his retirement. Lin left Micronics in late May 1992, replaced by Chuck C. Chan. Shortly afterward, Dado Banatao—founder of the influential graphics chipset companies Chips and Technologies and S3 Incorporated—joined Micronics' board. By 1994, Chan was replaced as CEO by Steven P. Kitrosser, formerly of Digital Equipment Corporation. In April 1994, Chang left to found his own company, Premax Electronics—a manufacturer of PC Cards for laptops—in Sunnyvale.

In June 1994, Micronics announced its acquisition of Orchid Technology—a manufacturer of multimedia computer peripherals also based in Fremont—keeping Orchid around as a subsidiary and brand. Micronics' acquisition of Orchid allowed them entry into the growing market of graphics adapters and sound cards; reciprocally, the fusion of talent between Micronics and Orchid allowed the latter to begin production cards based on digital video technology. Orchid was founded in 1982 by Le Bui and employed roughly 100 by the time they signed on to the acquisition. The acquisition was finalized in August 1994; no layoffs were immediately announced.

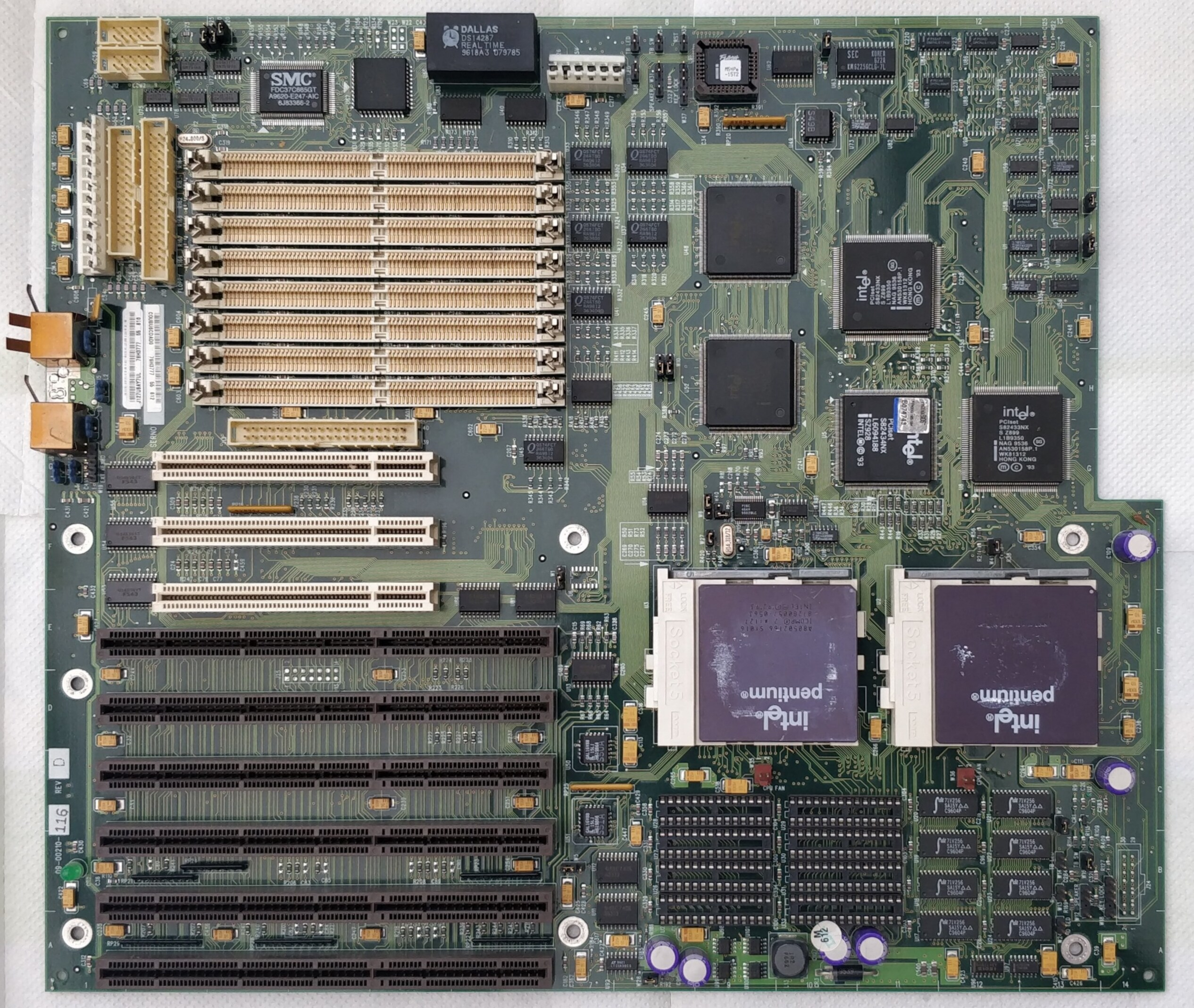
IBM commissioned Micronics for the manufacture of its PC Server 320's motherboard in its EISA configuration (pictured).

IBM's PC Server 300, released in October 1994, made use of a Micronics motherboard configured with either an Intel DX2 or a Pentium processor clocked at 60 MHz. This was one of few times in IBM's history that the company installed a third-party company's motherboard in a personal computer of theirs. The motherboard also eschewed from the company's proprietary Micro Bus architecture developed in the years prior by making use of the Peripheral Component Interconnect bus. Micronics sold the same motherboard used in the PC Server 300 to other vendors and as a standalone product. IBM commissioned Micronics again in 1995 for the manufacture of their PC Server 320's motherboard, which came configured with either a Micro Channel bus or an EISA bus and dual Pentium processor sockets. IBM manufactured the Micro Channel version while using Micronics' board for the EISA version.

=== Decline and Diamond merger (1995–1998) ===
Micronics struggled financially in 1995, due in part to its largest customer, the Osborne Computer, filing for receivership in Australia; this was Osborne's second go-around after its widely publicized first bankruptcy in the United States in the early 1980s. In the first half of the year, Micronics posted a loss of US$13.7 million. In October 1995, the company experienced another shuffling of management, wherein former managers of Orchid took over respective positions in Micronics. Simultaneously, half of Micronics' board of directors resigned. In late 1995, Micronics bought the remaining 20 percent of Osborne; the other 80 percent was acquired by Gateway 2000. In October 1996, a group of activist shareholders holding 10 percent of Micronics submit that the company find an interested buyer for a potential merger.

Micronics posted combined losses of $26.1 million between 1995 and 1996. In late 1996, Micronics launched a subdivision dedicated to designing and marketing networked workstations and servers. The company's first products were released in February 1997 and comprised midtowers featuring single or dual Pentium Pro processors. In June 1997, the company announced a potential acquisition of Hayes Microcomputer Products, a manufacturer of computer networking products—namely modems—based in Norcross, Georgia, that was aggressively struggling in the late 1990s. Talks between the two companies soon fizzled, however.

The establishment of its workstation division did not reverse Micronics' misfortunes, the company posting $5.4 million in losses between February and September 1997. The company's then-current chairman Shanker Munshani resigned September that year, replaced by William E. Shelander. In July 1998, Shelander agreed to sell the company to Diamond Multimedia for roughly $32 million. Diamond moved Micronics remaining employees from Fremont to Diamond's headquarters in San Jose and kept the name Micronics around as a sub-brand for some time.
