= Orchid Technology =

Defunct computer hardware company

- Company type: Private Company
- Founded: 1982; 43 years ago
- Founder: Le Nhon Bui
- Defunct: 1994
- Fate: Acquired by Micronics Computers, Inc.
- Products: Fahrenheit Video3D graphics accelerator; GameWave 32 capture card; Kelvin 64 graphics accelerator; PCNet 1mbs LAN card; ProDesigner IIS graphics card; Righteous 3D graphics accelerator; SoundWave 32 capture card; Vidiola capture card

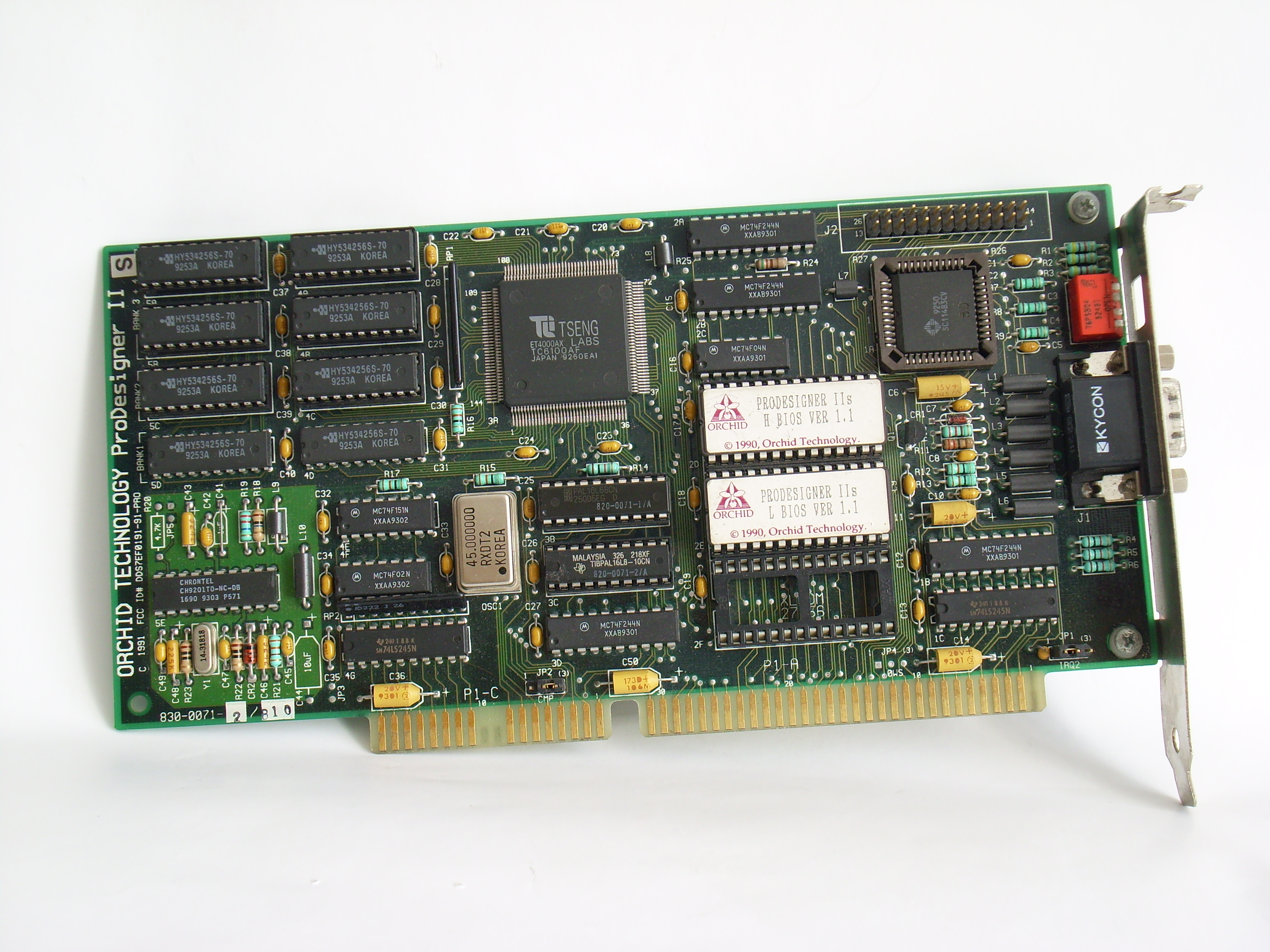
Orchid ProDesigner IIS graphics card

Orchid Technology was a privately held company founded by Le Nhon Bui in 1982.

== History ==
=== 1982 to 1984 ===
The company's original flagship product was its PCNet card, a 1 megabit-per-second LAN (networking) card for IBM PCs and clones. Notably, the acronym LAN (Local Area Networking) is the Vietnamese word for "Orchid". Hence, the origin of the company name.

Also in 1982, it introduced the Orchid Graphics Adapter, a graphics board for IBM PC compatible computers. It was intended to provide high resolution (at the time) monochrome graphic abilities to computers limited to text displays. It was aimed at the business market and one of the three first third party graphic boards for PCs.

After this successful product, the company embarked on introducing high-performance add-in cards, most notably the LIM (Lotus, Intel Microsoft standard) which extended DOS out to 1M, Multi-purpose network cards that included RAM, clock, serial printer ports and Network COAX TCP-IP capabilities. Orchid developed its own operating system as well as one of the first 5 OEM's of Novell. Other products included PC Turbo, TinyTurbo and TurboVGA enhancement cards that included 186 and 286 processors. As the operating systems took on more resources Orchid made a switch back to its roots as PC board manufacturer.

=== 1984 to 1986 ===
From 1984 to 1986 the company switched to an Autocad video board manufacturer. Later, a variety of memory and video cards were introduced.

=== After 1988 ===
In 1988, Orchid started designing and selling back-plane motherboards under the Privilege Systems Division. However, Orchid could not garner any significant market-share due to stiff competition from motherboard makers Micronics Computers, Inc., Mylex Corporation and American Megatrends Inc. (AMI), the original motherboard brand names in the industry.

=== 1994 ===
In August 1994, Orchid Technology was acquired by motherboard maker Micronics Computers, Inc. Orchid sold their products through Direct to Fortune companies, OEMs, System Integrators and National Distributors such as Gates/FA, Techdata, Ingram and Micro D.

== Graphic Cards ==
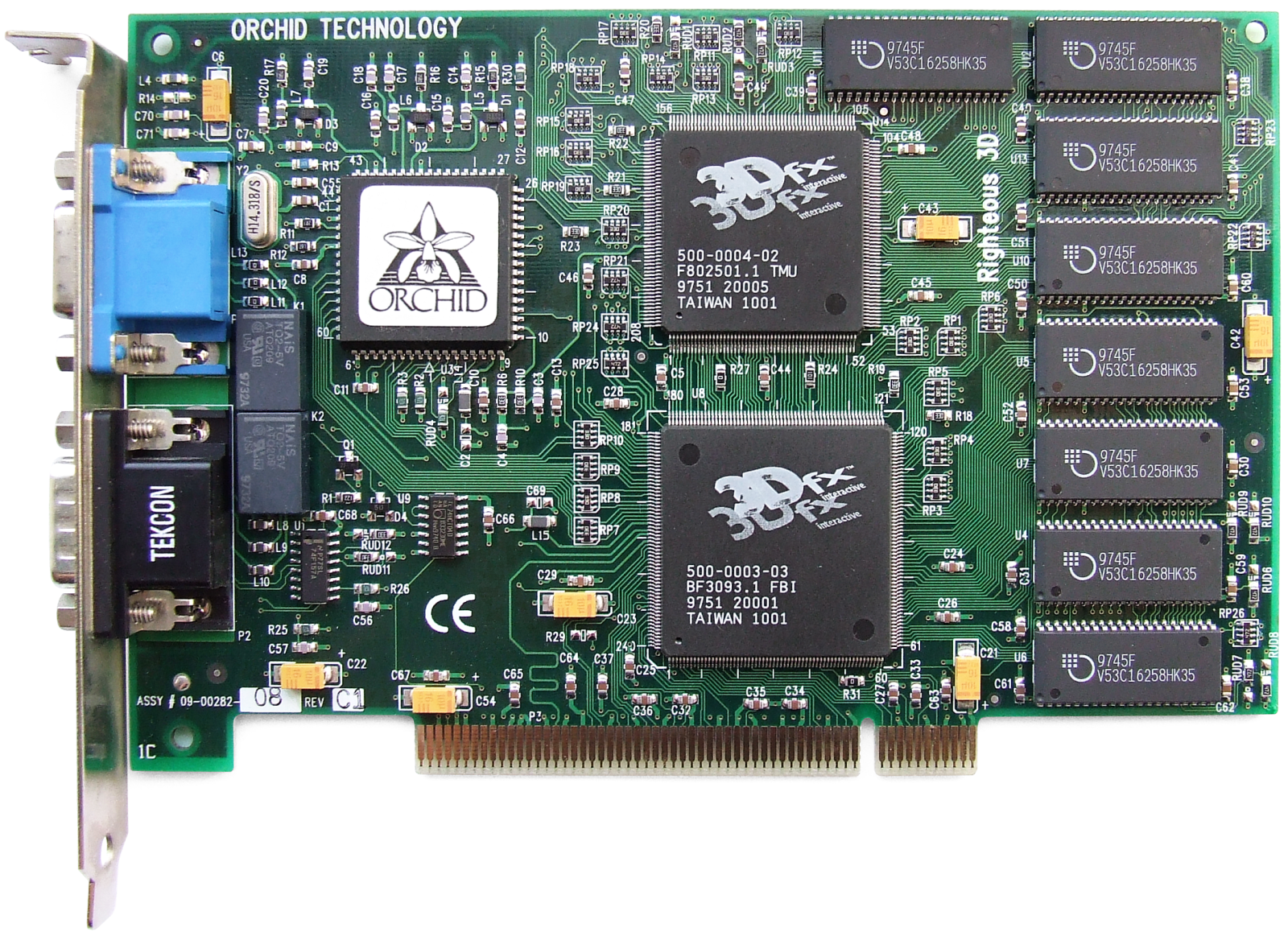
Righteous 3D using 3dfx Voodoo

Orchid was known for its Righteous 3D, Fahrenheit Video3D and Kelvin 64 graphics accelerators. They also manufactured an array of multimedia products including SoundWave 32 and GameWave 32 and the award-winning Vidiola line of digital capture and playback systems.

== See also ==
- List of defunct graphics chips and card companies
- Orchid Graphics Adapter
