= Palit Microsystems =

Taiwanese computrer hardware company

Palit Microsystems, Ltd.
- Native name: 同德股份有限公司
- Romanized name: Tóng dé gǔfèn yǒuxiàn gōngsī
- Type: Private
- Industry: Computer hardware
- Founded: 1988; 38 years ago
- Founder: Li Shilong
- Headquarters: Taipei, Taiwan
- Area served: Worldwide
- Products: Graphic cards
- Number of employees: < 3,000 (2023)
- Divisions: Gainward; KFA2; Daytona; GALAX; Vivkoo; Yuan; XpertVision
- Website: www.palit.com

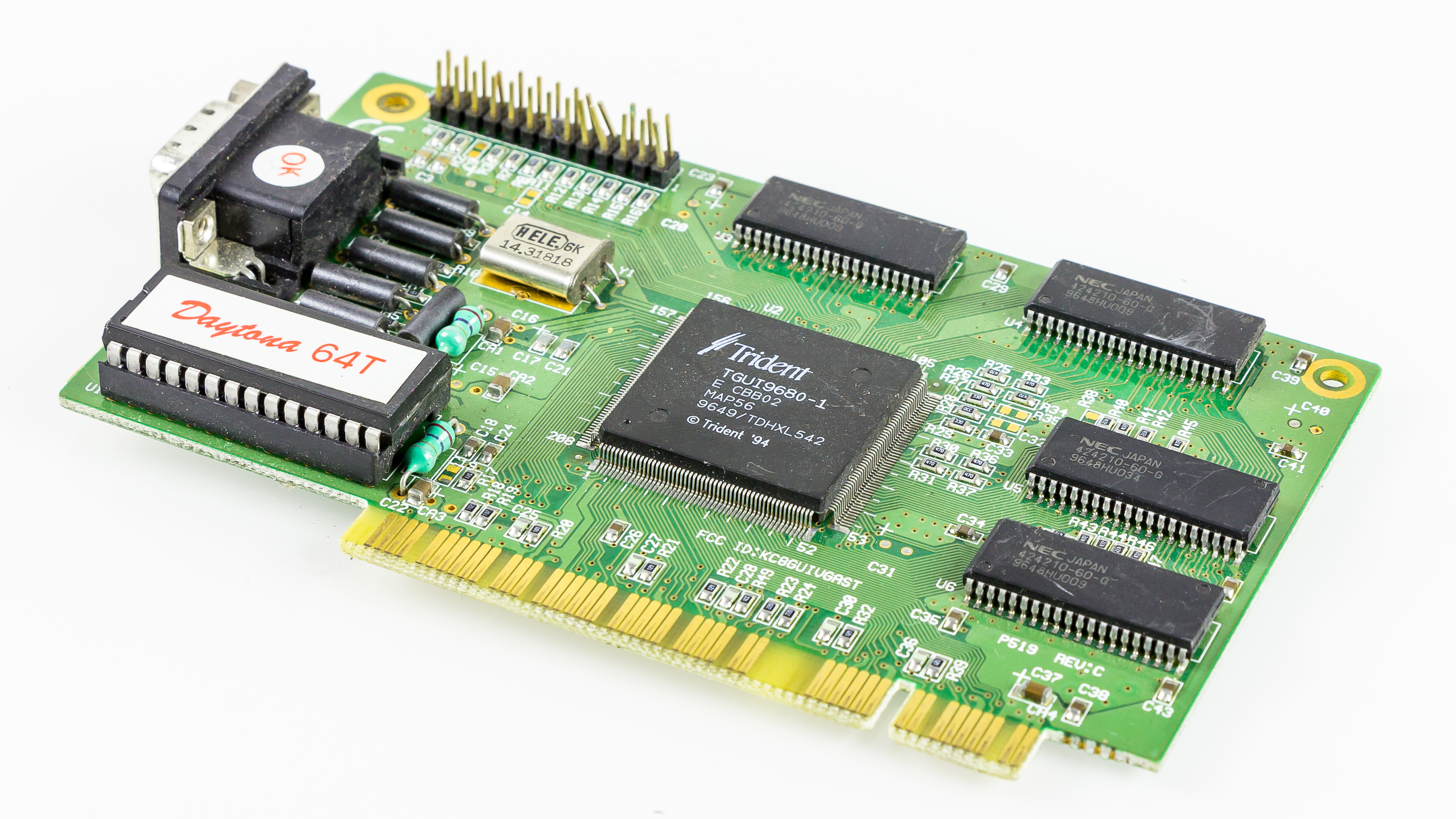
Graphic card Daytona 64T, based on Trident Microsystems chipset TGUI9680

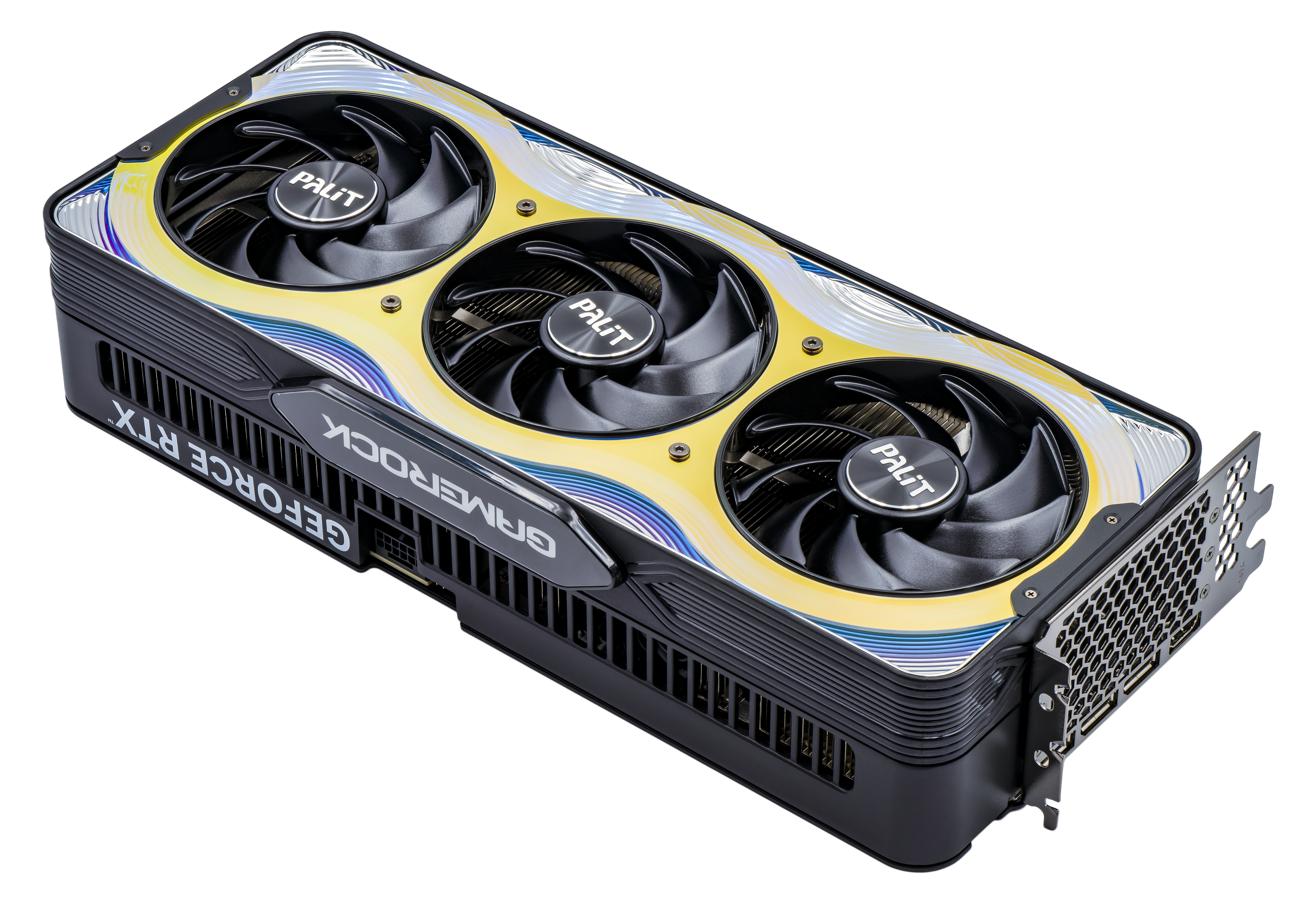
A video card by Palit, with NVIDIA GB202 graphics processor

Palit Microsystems, Ltd. is a Taiwanese computer hardware company, founded in 1988. It is known for exclusive manufacturing of graphic cards on the basis of Nvidia and ATI graphic chipsets. Palit's factories are found in mainland China, while the offices are in Taipei, a logistics center in Hong Kong, and branch office in Germany.

Palit Microsystems runs two major brands, Palit, and Gainward, which target different global markets, and other brands like Daytona, Galaxy (GALAX), Vivkoo, Yuan, KFA2 (Kick Fuckin Ass²), and XpertVision. It also contract-manufactures graphics cards for other companies. In 2013 Palit Microsystems surpassed ASUSTek, becoming the biggest graphics card vendor by volume. Palit Microsystems' monthly maximum capacity reaches 1,200,000 units. As of 2011 Palit's production share was about at 20–25% of world market of graphics solutions. In the same time on , ie Russian market Pal,it had more than 40%, in Ukraine – about 30%.

In 2005 Palit Microsystems acquired the Gainward brand, company and branch Gainward Europe GmbH for $1 million ofromTaiwan-based TNC Industrial.
