= Spea Software =

Defunct German graphics hardware manufacturer

Spea Software AG
- Type: Public (Aktiengesellschaft)
- Founded: 1985; 41 years ago in Starnberg, Bavaria
- Founder: Ulrich Seng
- Defunct: November 1995; 31 years ago
- Fate: Acquried by Diamond Multimedia
- Divisions: Video Seven (1993)

Spea Software AG was a German computer hardware and software company based in Starnberg, Bavaria. Founded in 1985, the company produced graphics cards for the IBM PC and compatibles. In 1995, Spea Software was acquired by Diamond Multimedia.

== History ==
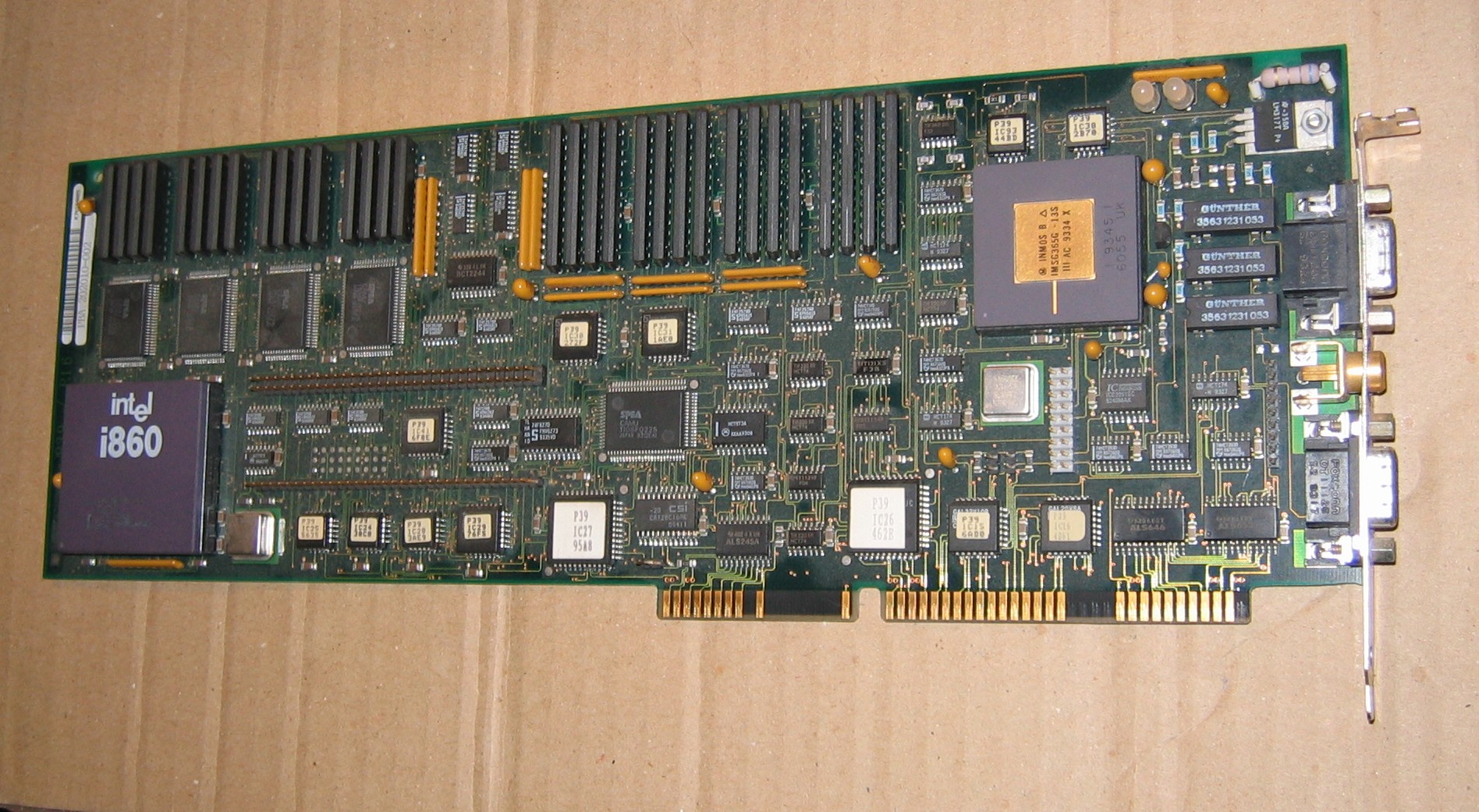
TIGA-based Spea Fire, featuring a i860 processor

Spea Software AG was founded in Starnberg, Bavaria, in 1985 by Ulrich Seng. The company's name is an acronym standing for Systeme für Professionelle Elektronik und Automation (Systems for Professional Electronics and Automation). The company chiefly produced graphics cards for the IBM PC and compatibles, at first producing ISA cards before branching out to VESA Local Bus and PCI cards in the 1990s.

In 1992, the company went public on the Frankfurt Stock Exchange. Some time in the late 1980s or early 1990s, the company established an American subsidiary by the name of Computer Visualization Technologies, Inc. (CVTI), headquartered in Fremont, California. In May 1993, Spea through CVTI acquired Video Seven, a major American graphics cards manufacturer based in Silicon Valley, from LSI Logic. This gave rise to the product line Spea/V7. Simultaneously with the acquisition of Video Seven, Seng stepped down as chairman of Spea.

After encountering difficulty marketing graphics cards under the Spea/V7 brand name, Spea had the Video Seven division shuttered in 1993. Spea themselves continued to sell multimedia peripherals such as sound and graphics cards with the Video Seven trademark into 1995. Sales at the company peaked at 174 million DM in 1994. In November 1995, Spea itself was acquired by Diamond Multimedia of the United States.

== Products ==
Although the company is considered a German graphics card pioneer, the company did not develop graphics chips itself (like Matrox, for example). Instead, it used chipsets from various manufacturers (including S3, Tseng Labs, and Avance Logic) for its graphics and multimedia cards. The drivers were developed by Spea itself.

Name	Bus	Chipset	Chipset manufacturer
Fire GL	PCI	GLINT GX300, S3 Vision968	3Dlabs, S3
ShowTime Plus	PCI, VLB	ET4000/W32(i/p)	Tseng Labs
V7-Mercury	ISA, VLB, PCI	S3 928	S3
V7-Mercury Lite	PCI	S3 928	S3
V7-Mercury Pro	ISA, VLB	S3 928	S3
V7-Mercury P-64	PCI, VLB	S3 Vision964	S3
V7-Mercury P-64 V	PCI, VLB	S3 Vision968	S3
V7-Mirage	ISA, VLB	S3 801/805	S3
V7-Mirage P-32	PCI, VLB	S3 Trio32	S3
V7-Mirage P-64	PCI, VLB	S3 864	S3
V7-Mirage P-64 (with S3 Trio64)	PCI, VLB	S3 Trio64	S3
V7-Mirage P-64 V	PCI, VLB	S3 868	S3
V7-Mirage Video	PCI	S3 Trio64V+	S3
V7-Mirage Video TV	PCI	S3 Trio64V+	S3
V7-VEGA	ISA, VLB	CL-GD542x	Cirrus Logic
V7-VEGA Pro	PCI, VLB	TGUI9440	Trident
V7-VEGA Plus	PCI, VLB	ALG2301, ALG2228	Avance Logic
V7-VEGA Video	PCI, VLB	ALG2302	Avance Logic
V7-Storm	PCI, VLB	Power 9100	Weitek
V7-Storm Pro	PCI, VLB	Power 9100	Weitek
