= Windows accelerator =

A Windows accelerator, or generically a GUI accelerator, was a type of graphics processing unit for personal computers with additional acceleration features like 2D line-drawing, blitter, clipping, font caching, hardware cursor support, color expansion, linear addressing, and pattern, polygon and area fills. This functionality was marketed for accelerating programs that used graphical user interfaces (GUIs), namely Microsoft Windows. Windows accelerators have been superseded by multipurpose GPUs, which include acceleration for 3D graphics.

Most "Windows accelerator" video cards were 2D-capable fixed-function processors that received 2D drawing commands and pixel data sent from the CPU, resulting in faster window drawing. The reduced burden on the CPU, combined with the smaller data stream needed for the required instructions, resulted in improved performance compared to "dumb" frame-buffer only based video cards.

In the high-end professional market, at prices in the thousands of dollars, there were also coprocessor based video chipsets like the Texas Instrument TMS34020 available, which allowed offloading of some of the processing from the CPU to the coprocessor's videocard.

To make use of these accelerator or coprocessor based video cards, driver software for the specific video chipset was necessary.

== See also ==
- SVGA
- VESA Local Bus
- Windows 3.1x
