= Socket AMx =

Socket AMx may refer to:

- Socket AM2
- Socket AM2+
- Socket AM3
- Socket AM3+
- Socket AM1
- Socket AM4
