= Athlon II =

Family of central processing unit models

AMD Athlon II

General information
- Launched: 2009
- Marketed by: AMD
- Designed by: AMD
- Common manufacturer: GlobalFoundries

Performance
- Max. CPU clock rate: 1.6 GHz to 3.5 GHz
- HyperTransport speeds: 1.8 GHz to 2 GHz

Physical specifications
- Cores: 1 - 4
- Sockets: AM3; AM2+

Architecture and classification
- Technology node: 45 nm to 32 nm
- Microarchitecture: AMD K10
- Instruction set: x86-64

Products, models, variants
- Core names: Sargas; Regor; Propus; Rana; Llano

History
- Predecessor: Athlon X2
- Successors: A-Series (APU); AMD FX

Athlon II is a family of AMD multi-core 45 nm central processing units, which is aimed at the budget to mid-range market and is a complementary product lineup to the Phenom II.

== Features ==
The Athlon II series is based on the AMD K10 architecture and derived from the Phenom II series. However, unlike its Phenom siblings, it does not contain any L3 Cache. There are two principal Athlon II dies: the dual-core Regor die with 1 MB L2 Cache per core and the four-core Propus with 512 KB per core. Regor is a native dual-core design with lower TDP and additional L2 to offset the removal of L3 cache. The Athlon II x2 200e-220 chips have less L2 cache than the rest of the Regor line. The triple-core Rana is derived from the Propus quad-core design, with one core disabled. In some cases, the Phenom II Deneb die is used with disabled L3 cache and cores in the case.

The processors include:

1. AMD Direct Connect Architecture
2. AMD Wide Floating Point Accelerator
3. AMD Digital Media XPress 2.0 Technology
4. AMD PowerNow!-Technology / Cool'n'Quiet-Technology
5. HyperTransport Technology (not the same as Intel Hyper-Threading)

Processors with an "e" following the model number (e.g., 245e) are low-power models, typically 45W for Athlons, 65W for Phenoms. Processors with a "u" following the model number (e.g., 250u) are ultra-low voltage models.

AMD Athlon II-based processor family
AMD K10	Quad-core	Dual-core	Quad-core	Triple-core	Dual-core	Single-core
Codename	Llano		Propus	Rana	Regor	Sargas
Lithography	32 nm		45 nm			
Socket	FM1		AM3			
Date released	Aug 2011	Feb-Jun 2012	Sep 2009	Nov 2009	Jun 2009	Aug 2009

== Cores ==
=== Regor (45 nm SOI with immersion lithography) ===
- Two AMD K10 cores (Some are chip harvested Propus or Deneb with two cores disabled)
- L1 cache: 64 kB + 64 kB (data + instructions) per core
- L2 cache: 1024 kB per core, full-speed (512 kB per core in Athlon II X2 200e-220)
- Memory controller: dual channel DDR2-1066 MHz (AM2+), dual channel DDR3-1333 (AM3) with unganging option
- MMX, Extended 3DNow!, SSE, SSE2, SSE3, SSE4a, AMD64, Cool'n'Quiet, NX bit, AMD-V
- Socket AM3, HyperTransport with 2 GHz
- Die Size: 117 mm²
- Power consumption (TDP): 25-65 Watts
- First release
  - June 2009 (Stepping C2)
- Clock rate: 1.6 - 3.6 GHz
- Models: Athlon II X2 250u - 280

=== Rana (45 nm SOI with immersion lithography) ===
- Three AMD K10 cores chip harvested from Propus or Deneb with one core disabled
- L1 cache: 64 kB + 64 kB (data + instructions) per core
- L2 cache: 512 kB per core, full-speed
- Memory controller: dual channel DDR2-1066 MHz (AM2+), dual channel DDR3-1333 (AM3) with unganging option
- MMX, Extended 3DNow!, SSE, SSE2, SSE3, SSE4a, AMD64, Cool'n'Quiet, NX bit, AMD-V
- Socket AM3, HyperTransport with 2 GHz
- Die Size: 169 mm²
- Power consumption (TDP): 45 Watts or 95 Watts
- First release
  - October 2009 (Stepping C2)
- Clock rate: 2.2–3.4 GHz
- Models: Athlon II X3 400e - 460

=== Propus (45 nm SOI with immersion lithography) ===
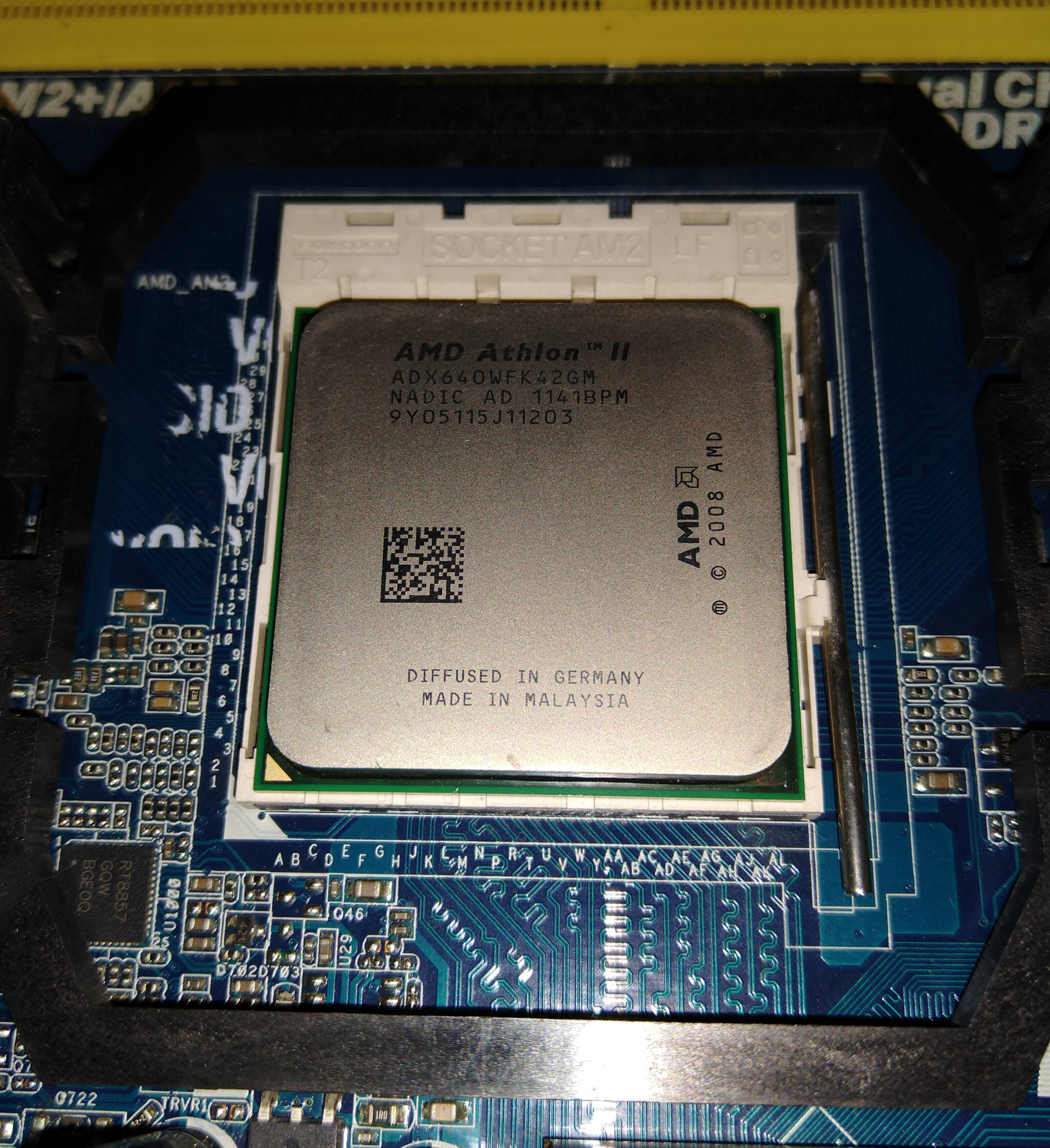
Athlon II X4 640 3.00 GHz

- Four AMD K10 cores chip harvested from Deneb with L3 cache disabled
- L1 cache: 64 kB + 64 kB (data + instructions) per core
- L2 cache: 512 kB per core, full-speed
- Memory controller: dual channel DDR2-1066 MHz (AM2+), dual channel DDR3-1333 (AM3) with unganging option
- MMX, Extended 3DNow!, SSE, SSE2, SSE3, SSE4a, AMD64, Cool'n'Quiet, NX bit, AMD-V
- Socket AM3, HyperTransport with 2 GHz
- Die Size: 169 mm²
- Power consumption (TDP): 45 Watts or 95 Watts
- First release
  - September 2009 (Stepping C2)
- Clock rate: 2.2–3.1 GHz
- Models: Athlon II X4 600e - 645, Phenom II x4 840

== See also ==
- List of AMD Athlon processors
- List of AMD Athlon X2 processors
- List of AMD Athlon II processors
- List of AMD Phenom processors
