= Socket AM2 =

CPU socket for old AMD CPUs

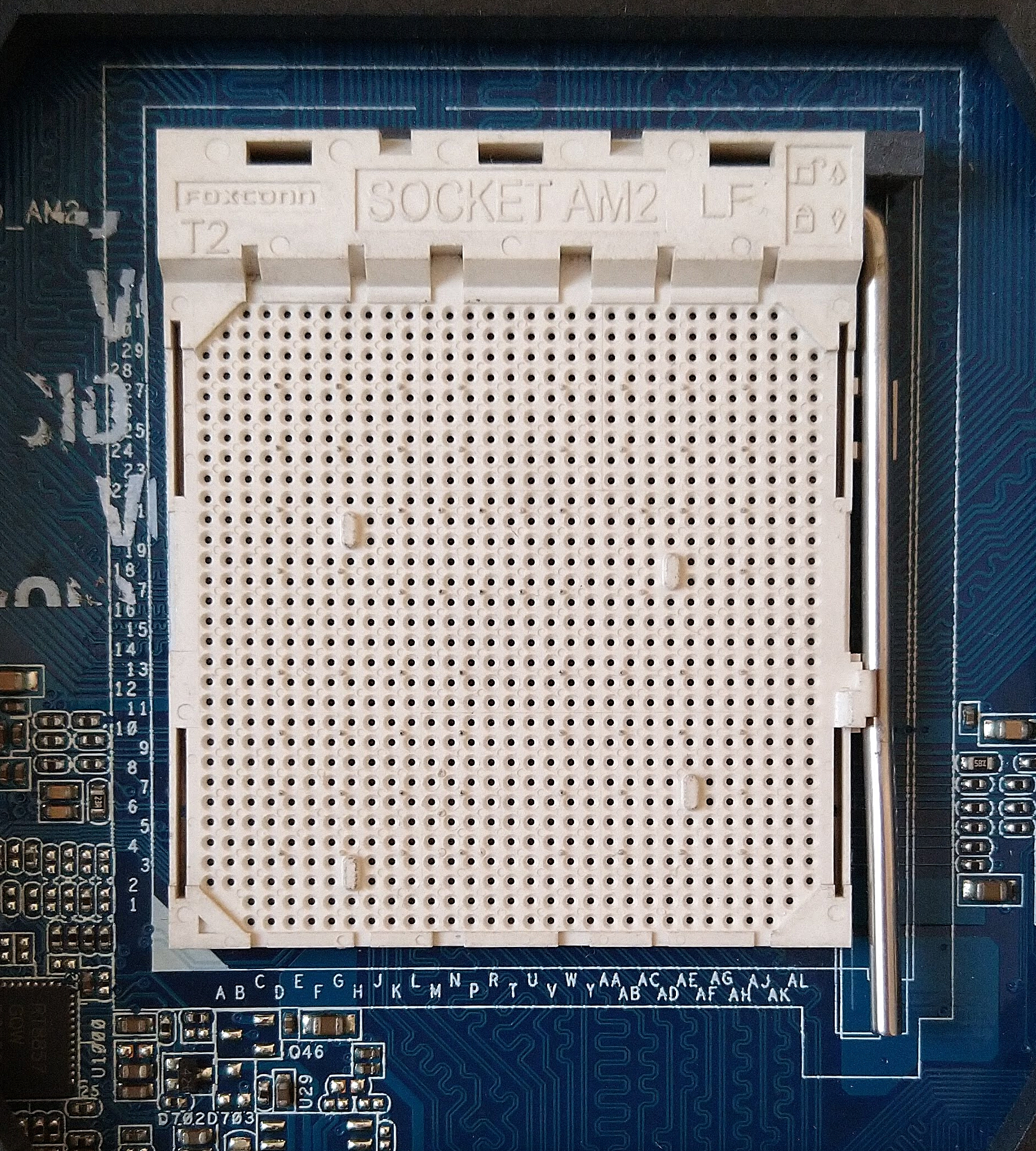
- Release date: May 2006
- Type: PGA-ZIF
- Chip form factors: Ceramic Pin Grid Array (CPGA); Organic Pin Grid Array (OPGA)
- Contacts: 940
- FSB frequency: 200 MHz System clock 1 GHz HyperTransport 2.0
- Processors: Athlon 64; Athlon 64 X2; Athlon 64 FX; Opteron; Sempron; Phenom
- Predecessor: Socket 939
- Successor: AM2+
- Memory support: DDR2
- This article is part of the CPU socket series

The Socket AM2, renamed from Socket M2 (to prevent using the same name as Cyrix MII processors), is a CPU socket designed by AMD for desktop processors, including the performance, mainstream and value segments. It was released on May 23, 2006, as a replacement for Socket 939.

== Technical specifications ==
AM2 processors are incompatible with 939 motherboards and vice versa, and although it has 940 pins, it is incompatible with Socket 940. Socket AM2 supports DDR2 SDRAM memory but not DDR memory, which the previous Socket 939 supported. AnandTech reported that Socket AM2 system performance was only about 7% faster than Socket 939 equivalents, with most applications about 2% faster, despite having over 30% greater memory bandwidth due to DDR2 support.

The first processor cores to support socket AM2 were the single-core Orleans (Athlon 64) and Manila (Sempron), and the dual-core Windsor (Athlon 64 X2 and Athlon 64 FX). Most processors on Socket AM2 include SSE3 instructions and were developed with 90 nanometer technology, while later models featured 65 nanometer technology.

Socket AM2 also supports newer AMD Phenom processors, which were originally built for Socket AM2+ but backward compatible with AM2, however, this depended upon the system/motherboard manufacturer to supply a BIOS firmware update to operate the processor.

Socket AM2 was a part of AMD's generation of CPU sockets that included Socket F for servers and Socket S1 for mobile computing.

There are also single-socket Opteron processors available for AM2.

While technical documentation was readily available for earlier generations of AMD processor sockets, the AM2 Processor Functional Data Sheet (AMD document number 31117) has not been made publicly available.

== Heatsink ==
The 4 holes for fastening the heatsink to the motherboard are placed in a rectangle with lateral lengths of 48 mm and 96 mm for AMD's sockets Socket AM2, Socket AM2+, Socket AM3, Socket AM3+ and Socket FM2. Cooling solutions should therefore be interchangeable.

== Successors ==
Multiple sockets have been announced which are in theory pin-compatible with socket AM2, but which differ in terms of features.

Socket AM2+

Socket AM2+ is an intermediate successor to socket AM2, which features split power planes, and HyperTransport 3.0. Socket AM2+ chips can plug into a socket AM2 motherboard (although certain motherboard manufacturers do not support this), but operate only with HyperTransport 2.0.

Socket AM3

Socket AM3 processors are able to run on Socket AM2 and AM2+ motherboards with appropriate BIOS updates, but not vice versa. AM3 processors have a new memory controller supporting both DDR2 and DDR3 SDRAM, allowing backwards compatibility with AM2 and AM2+ motherboards. Since AM2 and AM2+ processors lack the new memory controller, they will not work on AM3 motherboards.

== See also ==
- List of AMD FX microprocessors
- List of AMD microprocessors
- List of AMD Sempron microprocessors
- List of AMD Athlon 64 microprocessors
- List of AMD Phenom microprocessors
- List of AMD Opteron microprocessors
