= Socket AM3+ =

CPU socket for AMD CPUs

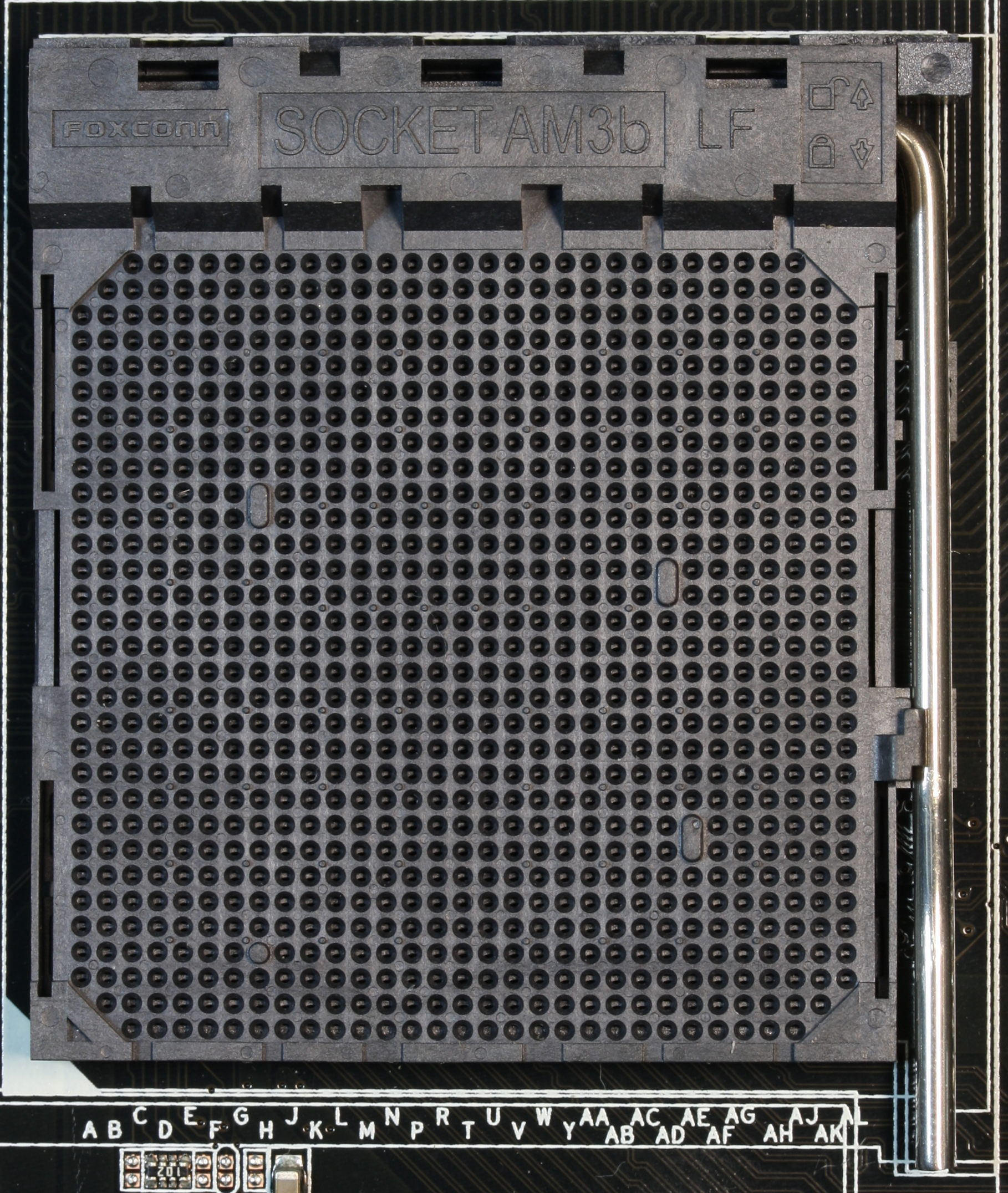
- Release date: October 2011
- Type: PGA-ZIF
- Chip form factors: PGA
- Contacts: 942 (Socket); 938 (Socket AM3 CPU); 940 (Bulldozer Based CPU)
- FSB protocol: HyperTransport 3.1
- FSB frequency: 200 MHz System clock HyperTransport up to 3.2 GHz
- Processor dimensions: 40 mm × 40 mm 1,600 mm²
- Processors: Phenom II; Athlon II; FX; Opteron
- Predecessor: AM3
- Successor: AM4
- Memory support: DDR3
- This article is part of the CPU socket series

Socket AM3+ is a modification of Socket AM3, which was released on February 9, 2009. AM3+ was released in mid-2011 designed for CPUs which use the AMD Bulldozer microarchitecture and retains compatibility with processors made for AM3. The Vishera line of AMD CPUs also all use Socket AM3+. It is the last AMD socket for which Windows XP support officially exists.

== Technical specifications ==
The AM3+ Socket specification contains a few noteworthy design changes over its AM3 predecessor. The 942 pin count for the AM3+ is an increase of one compared to the AM3 Socket layout. The AM3+ Socket has larger pin socket diameter of 0.51 mm compared to 0.45 mm with the AM3 Socket. There is a faster serial link of 3400 kHz from the CPU to the power controller, compared to 400 kHz. The AM3+ Socket offers improved power regulation and power quality specifications, including an increased maximum current support of 145 A versus 110 A. There is also a redesigned CPU cooler retention harness allowing for slightly better airflow for CPU cooling, while retaining cooler backward compatibility.

=== Compatibility ===
==== Processors accepted by the AM3+ socket ====
The 942-contact AM3+ socket accepts both the 940-pin AM3+ CPU and the 938-pin AM3 CPU. This backward compatibility is intentional.

==== Motherboards that can accept the AM3+ processor ====
AM3+ CPUs are not mechanically compatible with AM3 sockets as AM3+ CPUs have an additional pin that the AM3 socket can not accommodate. However, some manufacturers have found success in retrofitting AM3-technology motherboards for AM3+ processors by replacing the AM3 socket with AM3+ and providing a BIOS upgrade. This is called "AM3+ Ready". Potential incompatibilities with new AM3+ features include:

- Sideband temperature sensor interface for reading the temperature from the CPU. Without knowing the temperature, CPU PWM fan headers may only run at full speed.
- Certain power-saving features may not work, due to lack of support for rapid V_{CORE} switching.

While AM3+ CPUs can be inserted into AM2 or AM2+ sockets, AM3+ CPUs could not operate in motherboards designed for AM2+ or AM2 CPUs. These motherboards are designed for DDR2 memory but AM3+ CPUs only have a DDR3 memory controller.

== Heatsink ==
The 4 holes for fastening the heatsink to the motherboard are placed in a rectangle with lateral lengths of 48 mm and 96 mm for AMD's sockets Socket AM2, Socket AM2+, Socket AM3, Socket AM3+, Socket FM2, Socket FM2+, Socket FM1 and Socket AM1. Cooling solutions should therefore be interchangeable.

== See also ==
- List of AMD FX microprocessors
- List of AMD chipsets
