= Socket AM3 =

CPU socket for AMD CPUs

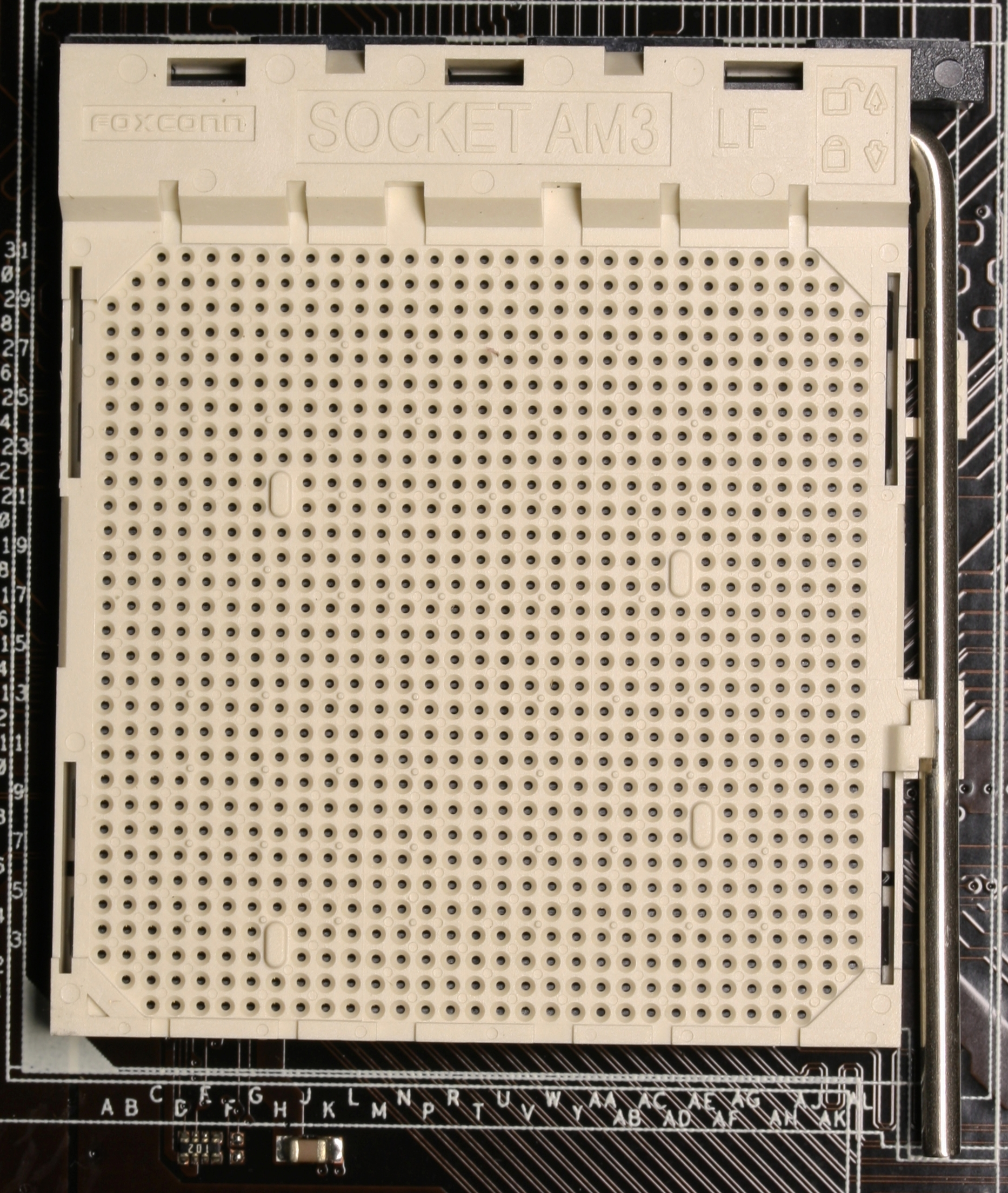
- Release date: February 2009
- Type: PGA-ZIF
- Chip form factors: PGA
- Contacts: 941 (Socket); 938 (CPU)
- FSB protocol: HyperTransport 3.x
- FSB frequency: 200 MHz System clock HyperTransport up to 2.6 GHz
- Processor dimensions: 40 mm × 40 mm 1,600 mm²
- Processors: Phenom II; Athlon II; Sempron; Opteron 1380 Series
- Predecessor: AM2+
- Successor: AM3+
- Memory support: DDR2 or DDR3
- This article is part of the CPU socket series

Socket AM3 is a CPU socket for AMD processors. AM3 was launched on February 9, 2009 as the successor to Socket AM2+, alongside the initial grouping of Phenom II processors designed for it. The sole principal change from AM2+ to AM3 is support for DDR3 SDRAM. The fastest CPU for socket AM3 is the Phenom II X6 1100T.

Like the previous AMD socket, the "AM3 Processor Functional Data Sheet" (AMD document number 40778) has not been made publicly available. The "Family 10h AMD Phenom™ Processor Product Data Sheet" (document 446878) has, but contains only a brief list of features of the Phenom, and does not contain any substantive technical data regarding socket AM3.

== Compatibility ==
=== Processors accepted by the AM3 socket ===
Socket AM3 breaks compatibility with AM2/AM2+ processors due to a subtle change in key placement. The AM3 socket has 941 pin contacts in a different layout while AM2+ processors have 940 pins. Tom's Hardware removed the two obstructing pins from an AM2+ Phenom processor in order to fit it into an AM3 socket. The processor did not work in the AM3 socket, but still worked in an AM2+ socket, suggesting: (1) the two pins are truly nonfunctional key pins and (2) compatibility issues run deeper than merely the key pins. It is likely because the built-in memory controller in AM2/AM2+ processors only supports DDR2 (unlike AM3 processors, which support both DDR2 & DDR3 memory).

A few motherboards were manufactured that supported both DDR2 and DDR3, however only one type could be used at a time. By using a (modified) AM3 socket they allow the insertion of any AM2, AM2+, or AM3 processor. By using specialized code they allow all these processors to work despite using the standard a northbridge and southbridge found on AM3 motherboards.

=== Sockets that accept the AM3 processor ===
As AM3 processors also support DDR2, they are backwards-compatible with Socket AM2/AM2+, contingent upon a BIOS update for the motherboard. Manufacturers including Asus, Gigabyte, and others have labeled existing AM2/AM2+ boards as being "AM3 Ready" or similar, indicating that BIOS support is provided for the specified boards. This allows existing AM2/AM2+ systems to upgrade the CPU without having to upgrade any other components.

== Heatsink ==
The 4 holes for fastening the heatsink to the motherboard are placed in a rectangle with lateral lengths of 48 mm and 96 mm for AMD's sockets Socket AM2, Socket AM2+, Socket AM3, Socket AM3+ and Socket FM2. Cooling solutions should therefore be interchangeable.

== Socket AM3+ ==
AM3+ is a modification of the AM3 socket. It has one additional contact for new Bulldozer-based AM3+ processors. DDR2 support is removed.

The AM3+ socket has 942 contacts. It can accept both the 938-pin AM3 processor and the 940-pin AM3+ processor. It cannot however accept AM2 or AM2+ processors because of mechanical keying and because they do not support DDR3.

The 940-pin AM3+ processor do not fit into the 941-contact AM3 socket due to different key-pin placement. Chipsets designed for AM3 can work with AM3+ given a socket replacement and a BIOS upgrade. "AM3+ Ready" has been used to describe such transitory motherboard designs.

== See also ==
- CPU Socket
- Athlon II
- Phenom II
- List of AMD Phenom microprocessors
- List of AMD FX microprocessors
