= Socket AM2+ =

CPU socket for old AMD CPUs

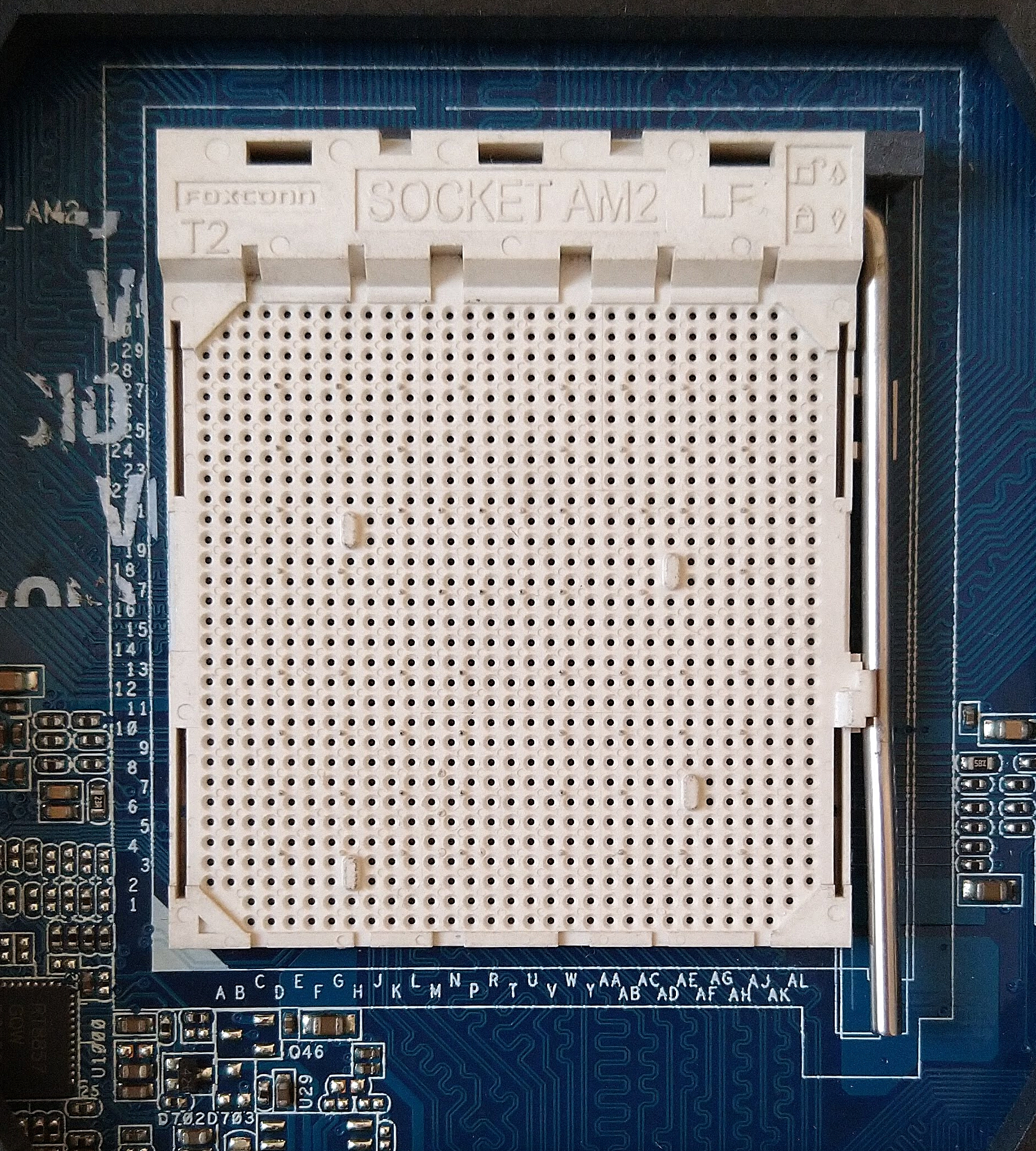
- Release date: November 2007
- Type: PGA-ZIF
- Chip form factors: Ceramic Pin Grid Array (CPGA); Organic Pin Grid Array (OPGA)
- Contacts: 940
- FSB frequency: 200 MHz System clock up to 2.6 GHz HyperTransport 3.0
- Processor dimensions: 40 mm × 40 mm 1,600 mm²
- Processors: Athlon 64; Athlon 64 X2; Athlon II; Opteron; Phenom; Phenom II
- Predecessor: AM2
- Successor: AM3
- Memory support: DDR2
- This article is part of the CPU socket series

Socket AM2+ is a CPU socket, which is the immediate successor to Socket AM2 that is used by several AMD processors such as Athlon 64 X2. Socket AM2+ is a mid-migration from Socket AM2 to Socket AM3 and both AM2+ and AM2 socket CPUs and motherboards have the potential to operate together. Actual interoperability depends upon other factors, especially the availability of compatible BIOS firmware, and some PC manufacturers, such as Dell, have not provided compatible BIOS versions that allow use of socket AM2+ CPUs on their products utilizing socket AM2 motherboards, such as the Inspiron 531. It was released in November 2007.

== Technical specifications ==
The main differences between Socket AM2 and AM2+ socket processors are as follows:

- HyperTransport 3.0 operating at up to 2.6 GHz
- Split power planes: one for the CPU cores, and the other for the Integrated Memory Controller (IMC). This will improve power savings, especially with integrated graphics, if the CPU cores are in sleep mode but the IMC is still active.

While technical documentation was readily available for earlier generations of AMD processor sockets, the "AM2r2 Processor Functional Data Sheet" (AMD document number 41607) has not been made publicly available.

=== AM2 compatibility ===
AMD confirmed that AM2 processors will work on AM2+ motherboards and AM2+ processors will work on AM2 motherboards. However, the operation of AM2+ processors on AM2 motherboards will be limited to the specifications of Socket AM2 (1 GHz HyperTransport 2.0, and one power plane for both cores and the IMC). AM2 processors do not benefit from the faster HyperTransport 3.0 and separate power planes on AM2+ motherboards. As with AM2 components, AM2+ CPUs and motherboards are designed to use DDR2 RAM exclusively.

Many manufacturers, such as Dell in the case of their Inspiron 531, have yet to (and may choose not to) release BIOS updates that would enable this compatibility. As a result, some consumers are unable to upgrade their PCs with AM2+ CPUs despite this being technically possible, and instead would have to buy a new motherboard to upgrade the processor. MSI has simply stated that their AM2 motherboards are not compatible with AM2+ processors.

=== AM3 compatibility ===
AMD confirmed that there is an upgrade path from Socket AM2+ to AM3:

- AM3 processors work on AM2+ motherboards due to the presence of both the DDR2 and DDR3 memory controllers on the processor
- AM2+ processors do not work on AM3 motherboards due to the processor's lack of a DDR3 memory controller

The AM3 socket has 941 pins instead of AM2+’s 940. The keying is designed in a way so that an AM3 processor (938 pins) can mechanically fit into an AM2 socket, but an AM2+ processor will not fit into an AM3 socket. This is in line with the compatibility status shown above. There are BIOS upgrades that make an AM2+ motherboard "AM3 ready", i.e. able to use an AM3 processor.

== Heatsink ==
The 4 holes for fastening the heatsink to the motherboard are placed in a rectangle with lateral lengths of 48 mm and 96 mm for AMD's sockets Socket AM2, Socket AM2+, Socket AM3, Socket AM3+ and Socket FM2. Cooling solutions should therefore be interchangeable.

=== Hybrid motherboards ===
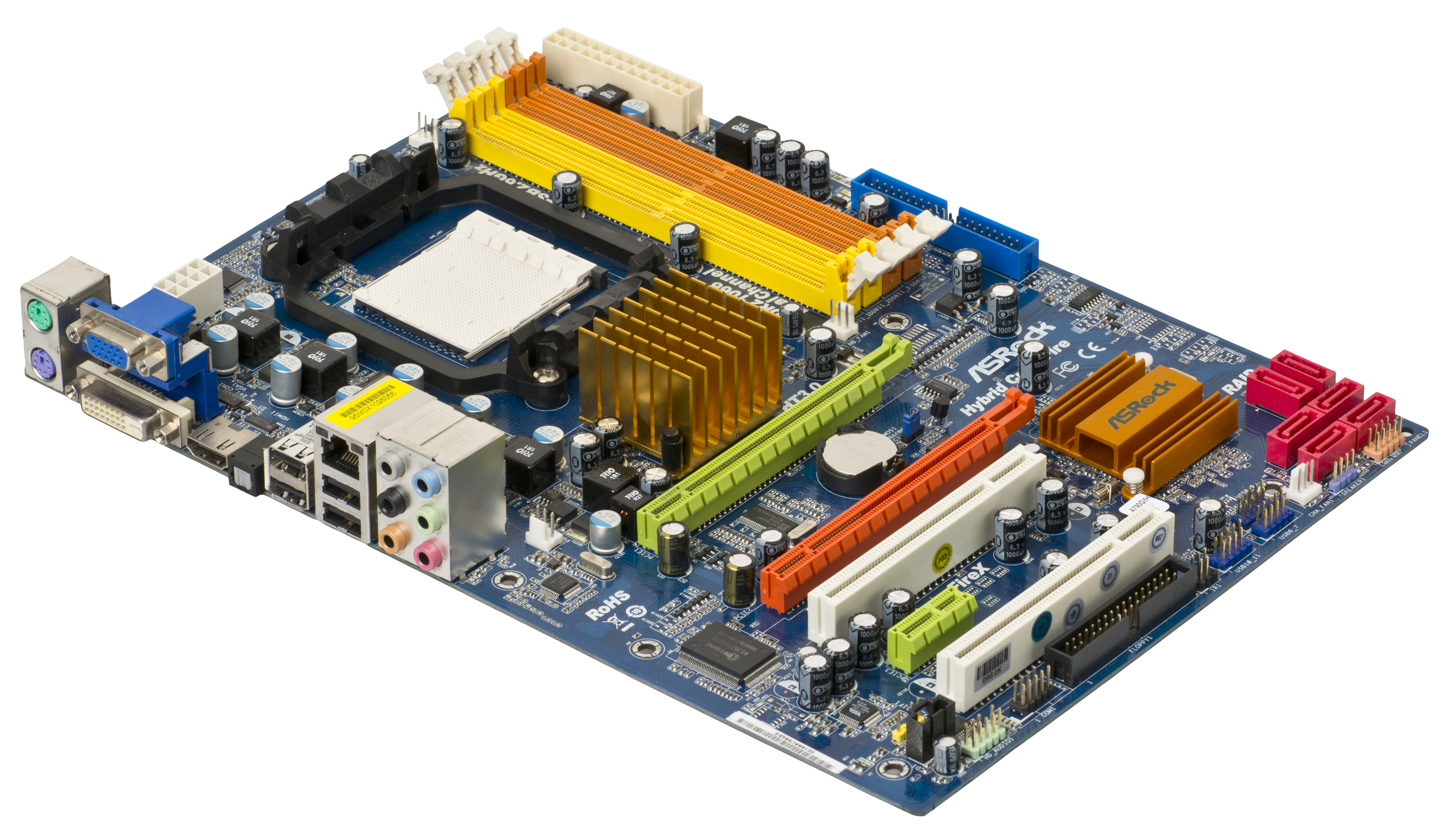
An A790GXH motherboard that can support AM2, AM2+ and AM3 socket CPUs

Some motherboard manufacturers (e.g. ASRock, Jetway, and MSI) have released hybrid motherboards that are equipped with an AM2+ socket and both DDR2 and DDR3 memory slots. These boards permit the use of AM2/AM2+ processors with DDR2 RAM, or AM3 processors with either DDR2 or DDR3 RAM.

== Successors ==
Socket AM3

The principal change from AM2+ to AM3 is support for DDR3 SDRAM.

Socket AM3+

AM3+ is a modification of the AM3 Socket designed for CPUs which use the Bulldozer microarchitecture.

== See also ==
- List of AMD microprocessors
- List of AMD Phenom microprocessors
- List of AMD Athlon 64 microprocessors
- List of AMD Sempron microprocessors
- List of AMD FX microprocessors
