= Piledriver (microarchitecture) =

Microarchitecture by AMD

Piledriver - Family 15h (2nd-gen)
General information
- Launched: May 15, 2012; 14 years ago
- Common manufacturer: AMD

Physical specifications
- Sockets: Socket AM3+; Socket FM2; Socket FS1; Socket FP2 (μBGA-827)

Architecture and classification
- Technology node: 32 nm SOI GF
- Instruction set: AMD64 (x86-64)
- Extensions: Crypto AES, SHA; SIMD MMX-plus, SSE, SSE2, SSE3, SSSE3, SSE4.1, SSE4.2, SSE4A, FMA3, FMA4, AVX

Products, models, variants
- Core names: AMD APU; AMD FX; Opteron

History
- Predecessor: Bulldozer - Family 15h
- Successor: Steamroller - Family 15h (3rd-gen)

Support status
- iGPU unsupported

AMD Piledriver Family 15h is a microarchitecture developed by AMD as the second-generation successor to Bulldozer. It targets desktop, mobile and server markets. It is used for the AMD Accelerated Processing Unit (formerly Fusion), AMD FX, and the Opteron line of processors.

The changes over Bulldozer are incremental. Piledriver uses the same "module" design. Its main improvements are to branch prediction and FPU/integer scheduling, along with a switch to hard-edge flip-flops to improve power consumption. This resulted in clock speed gains of 8–10% and a performance increase of around 15% with similar power characteristics. FX-9590 is around 40% faster than Bulldozer-based FX-8150, mostly because of higher clock speed.

Products based on Piledriver were first released on 15 May 2012 with the AMD Accelerated Processing Unit (APU), code-named Trinity, series of mobile products. APUs aimed at desktops followed in early October 2012 with Piledriver-based FX-series CPUs released later in the month. Opteron server processors based upon Piledriver were announced in early December 2012.

== Design ==
Piledriver includes improvements over the original Bulldozer microarchitecture:

- Clustered Multi-Thread
- Higher clock rates
- Instructions per clock (IPC) improvements
- Lower power consumption and temperatures
- Turbo Core 3.0
- Faster integrated memory controller (IMC)
- Fixed hardware divider
- Improved branch prediction and prefetching
- Perceptron branch predictor
- Improved floating-point and integer scheduling
- Support for Advanced Vector Extensions (AVX), FMA3, BMI1 and TBM
- Larger L1 translation lookaside buffers (TLB) and L2 efficiency improvements
- Switch to hard-edge flip-flops, allowing a decrease in power consumption
- Cyclos resonant clock mesh (RCM) technology
- 17–220 W thermal design power (TDP)

== Features ==
=== APUs ===
APU features table

== Processors ==
=== Desktop ===
Model	CPU					GPU			TDP (W)	DDR3 Memory	Turbo Core 3.0	Socket
Model	[Modules/FPUs] Cores/threads	Freq. (GHz)		Cache		Model	Config	Freq. (MHz)	TDP (W)	DDR3 Memory	Turbo Core 3.0	Socket
Model	[Modules/FPUs] Cores/threads	Base	Turbo	L2	L3	Model	Config	Freq. (MHz)	TDP (W)	DDR3 Memory	Turbo Core 3.0	Socket
FX-9590	[4]8	4.7	5.0	4× 2MB	8MB	—N/a			220	1866	Yes	AM3+
FX-9370	[4]8	4.4	4.7	4× 2MB	8MB	—N/a			220	1866	Yes	AM3+
FX-8370	[4]8	4.0	4.3	4× 2MB	8MB	—N/a			125	1866	Yes	AM3+
FX-8370E	[4]8	3.3	4.3	4× 2MB	8MB	—N/a			95	1866	Yes	AM3+
FX-8350	[4]8	4.0	4.2	4× 2MB	8MB	—N/a			125	1866	Yes	AM3+
FX-8320	[4]8	3.5	4.0	4× 2MB	8MB	—N/a			125	1866	Yes	AM3+
FX-8320E	[4]8	3.2	4.0	4× 2MB	8MB	—N/a			95	1866	Yes	AM3+
FX-8310	[4]8	3.4	4.3	4× 2MB	8MB	—N/a			95	1866	Yes	AM3+
FX-8300	[4]8	3.3	4.2	4× 2MB	8MB	—N/a			95	1866	Yes	AM3+
FX-6350	[3]6	3.9	4.2	3× 2MB	8MB	—N/a			125	1866	Yes	AM3+
FX-6300	[3]6	3.5	4.1	3× 2MB	8MB	—N/a			95	1866	Yes	AM3+
FX-4350	[2]4	4.2	4.3	2× 2MB	8MB	—N/a			125	1866	Yes	AM3+
FX-4320	[2]4	4.0	4.2	2× 2MB	4MB	—N/a			95	1866	Yes	AM3+
FX-4300	[2]4	3.8	4.0	2× 2MB	4MB	—N/a			95	1866	Yes	AM3+
A10-6800K	[2]4	4.1	4.4	2× 2MB	—N/a	HD 8670D	384:24:8	844	100	2133	Yes	FM2
A10-6700	[2]4	3.7	4.3	2× 2MB	—N/a	HD 8670D	384:24:8	844	65	1866	Yes	FM2
A10-5800K	[2]4	3.8	4.2	2× 2MB	—N/a	HD 7660D	384:24:8	800	100	1866	Yes	FM2
A10-5700	[2]4	3.4	4.0	2× 2MB	—N/a	HD 7660D	384:24:8	760	65	1866	Yes	FM2
A8-6600K	[2]4	3.9	4.2	2× 2MB	—N/a	HD 8570D	256:16:8	844	100	1866	Yes	FM2
A8-6500	[2]4	3.5	4.1	2× 2MB	—N/a	HD 8570D	256:16:8	800	65	1866	Yes	FM2
A8-5600K	[2]4	3.6	3.9	2× 2MB	—N/a	HD 7560D	256:16:8	760	100	1866	Yes	FM2
A8-5500	[2]4	3.2	3.7	2× 2MB	—N/a	HD 7560D	256:16:8	760	65	1866	Yes	FM2
A6-6400K	[1]2	3.9	4.1	1MB	—N/a	HD 8470D	192:12:4	800	65	1866	Yes	FM2
A6-5400K	[1]2	3.6	3.8	1MB	—N/a	HD 7540D	192:12:4	760	65	1866	Yes	FM2
A4-5300	[1]2	3.4	3.6	1MB	—N/a	HD 7480D	128:8:4	723	65	1600	Yes	FM2
A4-4000	[1]2	3.0	3.2	1MB	—N/a	HD 7480D	128:8:4	723	65	1333	Yes	FM2

The K suffix denotes an unlocked A-series processor. All FX-series processors are unlocked unless otherwise specified.

=== Mobile ===
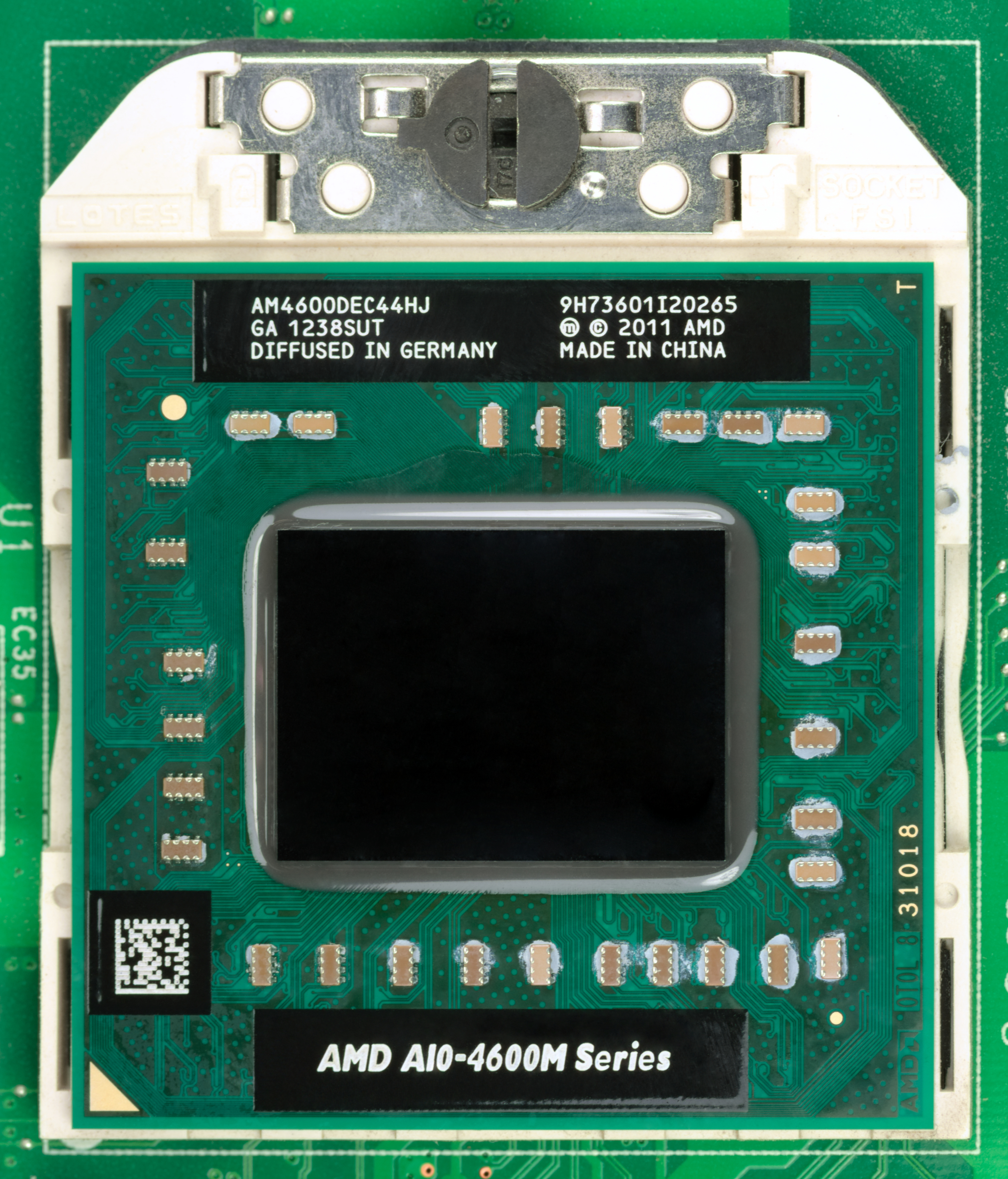
An AMD A10-4600M APU

Model	CPU				GPU				TDP (W)	DDR3 Memory	Socket
Model	[Modules/FPUs] Cores/threads	Freq.(GHz)		L2 Cache (MB)	Model	Config	Freq.(GHz)		TDP (W)	DDR3 Memory	Socket
Model	[Modules/FPUs] Cores/threads	Base	Turbo	L2 Cache (MB)	Model	Config	Base	Turbo	TDP (W)	DDR3 Memory	Socket
A10-5750M	[2]4	2.5	3.5	2× 2MB	HD 8650G	384:24:8	533	720	35	1866	FS1r2
A10-4600M	[2]4	2.3	3.2	2× 2MB	HD 7660G	384:24:8	496	685	35	1866	FS1r2
A8-5550M	[2]4	2.1	3.1	2× 2MB	HD 8550G	256:16:8	554	720	35	1866	FS1r2
A8-4500M	[2]4	1.9	2.8	2× 2MB	HD 7640G	256:16:8	496	685	35	1866	FS1r2
A6-5350M	[1]2	2.9	3.5	1	HD 8450G	192:12:4	533	720	35	1600	FS1r2
A6-4400M	[1]2	2.7	3.2	1	HD 7520G	192:12:4	496	685	35	1600	FS1r2
A4-5150M	[1]2	2.7	3.3	1	HD 8350G	128:8:4	514	720	35	1600	FS1r2
A4-4300M	[1]2	2.5	3.0	1	HD 7420G	128:8:4	480	655	35	1600	FS1r2
A10-5757M	[2]4	2.5	3.5	2× 2MB	HD 8650G	384:24:8	533	720	35	1600	FP2(BGA)
A10-5745M	[2]4	2.1	2.9	2× 2MB	HD 8610G	384:24:8	533	626	25	1333	FP2(BGA)
A10-4655M	[2]4	2.0	2.8	2× 2MB	HD 7620G	384:24:8	360	496	25	1333	FP2(BGA)
A8-5557M	[2]4	2.1	3.1	2× 2MB	HD 8550G	384:24:8	515	720	35	1600	FP2(BGA)
A8-5545M	[2]4	1.7	2.7	2× 2MB	HD 8510G	384:24:8	450	554	19	1333	FP2(BGA)
A8-4555M	[2]4	1.6	2.4	2× 2MB	HD 7600G	384:24:8	320	424	19	1333	FP2(BGA)
A6-5357M	[1]2	2.9	3.5	1	HD 8450G	192:12:4	533	720	35	1600	FP2(BGA)
A6-5345M	[1]2	2.2	2.8	1	HD 8410G	192:12:4	450	600	17	1333	FP2(BGA)
A6-4455M	[1]2	2.1	2.6	1	HD 7500G	256:16:8	327	424	17	1333	FP2(BGA)
A4-5145M	[1]2	2.0	2.6	1	HD 8310G	192:12:4	424	544	17	1333	FP2(BGA)
A4-4355M	[1]2	1.9	2.4	1	HD 7400G	192:12:4	327	424	17	1333	FP2(BGA)

=== Server ===
Some Opteron 32 nm processors.

== History ==
=== Komodo platform ===
Leaked roadmaps showed Piledriver CPUs featuring up to ten cores as part of the Komodo platform. Komodo was to launch in 2012 on the FM2 socket, but this never happened. AMD kept the AM3+ socket for the FX series and put the Piledriver-based APUs on FM2.

=== FX-series, Athlon and Opteron ===
In 2010 AMD revealed that the 2nd generation was scheduled for 2012; AMD referred to this generation as Enhanced Bulldozer. This later generation of Bulldozer core was codenamed Piledriver.

- Vishera FX-series CPU – Desktop Performance market (Volan platform): This FX-series aimed at 95–220 W TDP features 4, 6 and 8 Piledriver core CPU models; with Turbo Core 3.0 while using the existing Socket AM3+ format and 900 series motherboard chipsets of the 1st generation FX-series Zambezi processor. The 2nd generation FX-series was released on 23 October 2012 with the FX-8350, FX-8320, FX-6300 and FX-4300 CPU models. The FX-8350 featured slightly improved power consumption and was found to be approximately 15% more powerful than the fastest Bulldozer CPU. The 2nd generation FX-series was praised for its affordability. The FX 8320 was recognized as a price/performance winner, often matching Intel's i7 2600 at half the cost. The Vishera CPUs competed well when compared to similarly priced Intel Ivy Bridge CPUs in multi-core-aware applications and somewhat underperform in overall efficiency and in tasks where most CPU cores were not fully utilized such as single-threaded applications and a number of games.

On June 11, 2013, AMD announced two additional FX-series eight Piledriver core CPUs, the FX-9590 and FX-9370, running at a maximum turbo speed of 5.0 GHz and 4.7 GHz respectively, making AMD the first company to ever release a 5 GHz CPU commercially. AMD specify that the 9xxx series processors require "robust liquid cooling" due to their high Thermal Design Power (TDP)

- Trinity & Richland Athlon series CPU – Desktop Budget market: Socket FM2 Athlon X4 730, 740, 750K and 760k CPU models feature the four Piledriver core Trinity microarchitecture but lack on-chip integrated graphics. Athlon X2 340 is dual core model. Socket FM2 Richland based Athlon X4 760K and Athlon X2 370K CPUs, both with no GPU and four and dual cores respectively were expected.

For the server market, three versions were stated to be under development:

- Web serving, Web hosting, and Microserver platform (1 CPU) market: Opteron 3200-series (Zurich; 4 or 8 cores) was to be replaced by Delhi (4 or 8 cores) using the Socket AM3+ format from the Desktop FX-series line. The memory controller was to support dual-channel DDR3 memory configuration.
- Cost/energy efficient server (1 to 2 CPUs) market: Opteron 4200-series (Valencia; 6 or 8 cores) was to be replaced by Seoul (6 or 8 cores). Seoul would continue to use the Socket C32 format. The memory controller would support dual-channel DDR3 memory configuration.
- Enterprise/mainstream server (2 to 4 CPUs) market: Opteron 6200-series (Interlagos; 4, 8, 12, and 16 cores) was to be replaced by Abu Dhabi (4, 8, 12, and 16 cores)). Abu Dhabi will continue to use the Socket G34. The memory controller would support quad-channel DDR3 memory configuration.

=== APU lines ===
- Trinity A-series APU – Desktop Budget and Mainstream market (Virgo platform): The Stars-based Llano Socket FM1 APU line replacements are the 2 and 4 Piledriver core Socket FM2 Trinity Fusion APUs. The A10-5800K, A10-5700, A8-5600K, A8-5500, A6-5400K and A4-5300 APU models were released on 2 October 2012. Trinity processor model numbers ending with the letter "K" denote processors with an unlocked CPU multiplier. The Trinity APU line was praised for its superior integrated graphics performance but underperformed comparable Intel CPU models in most computationally intensive tasks.
- Trinity A-series APU – Notebook Mainstream and Performance market (Comal platform): Notebook computers featuring Trinity APUs shipped as early as June 2012. The mobile Trinity series features four APUs: A10-4600M, A8-4500M, A6-4400M and A4-4300M. In March 2013, AMD announced two more mobile models: A8-4557M and A10-4657M.

In January 2013, AMD officially introduced a new series of APUs codenamed Richland. The series features six new APUs in total. The fastest model, the A10-6800K, featured two Piledriver modules operating at 4.1 GHz and 4.4 GHz in turbo mode and an integrated HD 8670D GPU with 384 stream processors operating at 844 MHz. Only the A10-6800K has official DDR3-2133 memory support. The A10-6800K offered approximately 5% performance improvements in performance applications and 3D games over its A10-5800K Trinity based predecessor, largely due to Richland's higher clock speeds and higher overclocking potential than Trinity. On March 12, 2013, AMD officially introduced four Richland mobile APUs. On June 4, 2013, AMD officially announced six Richland desktop APUs.

== Performance ==
In January 2012, Microsoft released two hotfixes (2646060 and 2645594) for Windows 7 and Server 2008 R2 that significantly improved the performance of Clustered Multi-Thread based AMD CPUs by improving thread scheduling.

Windows 8 supports CMT-based CPUs out of the box by addressing each core as logical cores and modules as physical cores.

== See also ==
- Steamroller (microarchitecture)
- List of AMD CPU microarchitectures
- AMD Accelerated Processing Unit
- List of AMD accelerated processing unit microprocessors
- List of AMD FX microprocessors
- Opteron

Turion / ULV		Node range label	x86			
Microarchi.	Step	Node range label	Microarchi.	Step		
		180 nm	K7	Athlon Classic		
		180 nm	K7	Thunderbird		
		180 nm	K7	Palomino		
		130 nm	K7	Thoroughbred		
		130 nm	K7	Barton/Thorton		
		130 nm	K8	ClawHammer		
		130 nm	K8	Newcastle		
		130 nm	K8	SledgeHammer		
K8L	Lancaster	90 nm	K8	Winchester	K8(×2)	K9
K8L	Richmond	90 nm	K8	San Diego	Toledo	~~Greyhound~~
K8L	Taylor / Trinidad	90 nm	K8	San Diego	Windsor	
K8L	Tyler	65 nm	K8	Orleans	Brisbane	
K8L	Lion	65 nm	K10	Phenom	4 cores on mainstream desktop, DDR3 introduced	
K8L	Caspian	45 nm	K10	Phenom II / Athlon II	6 cores on mainstream desktop	
14h	Bobcat	40 nm				
		32 nm	K10	Lynx		
		32 nm	K10	Llano	APU introduced; CPU and GPU on single die	
		32 nm	Bulldozer 15h	Bulldozer	8 cores on mainstream desktop	
		32 nm	Bulldozer 15h	Piledriver		
16h	Jaguar	28 nm	Bulldozer 15h	Steamroller	APU/mobile-only	
16h	Puma	28 nm	Bulldozer 15h	Excavator	APU/mobile-only, DDR4 introduced	
K12	~~K12 (ARM64)~~	14 nm	Zen	Zen	SMT introduced	
		12 nm	Zen	Zen+		
		7 nm	Zen	Zen 2	12 and 16 cores on mainstream desktop, chiplet design	
		7 nm	Zen	Zen 3	3D V-Cache variants introduced	
		6 nm	Zen	Zen 3+	Mobile-only, DDR5 introduced	
		5 nm / 4 nm	Zen	Zen 4	High core density "Cloud" (Zen xc) variants introduced	
		4 nm / 3 nm	Zen	Zen 5	Ryzen AI NPU cores introduced	
		3 nm / 2 nm	Zen	Zen 6		
		2 nm	Zen	Zen 7		
