= List of AMD Phenom processors =

The AMD Phenom family is a 64-bit microprocessor family from Advanced Micro Devices (AMD), based on the K10 microarchitecture. It includes the AMD Phenom II X6 hex-core series, Phenom X4 and Phenom II X4 quad-core series, Phenom X3 and Phenom II X3 tri-core series, and Phenom II X2 dual-core series. Other related processors based on the K10 microarchitecture include the Athlon X2 Kuma processors, Athlon II processors, and various Opteron, Sempron, and Turion series. The first Phenoms were released in November 2007. An improved second generation was released in December 2008, named Phenom II. Processors with an e following the model number (e.g., 910e) are low-power models, usually 45 W for Athlons, 65 W for Phenoms. Processors with a "u" following the model number (e.g., 270u) are ultra-low-power models, usually 20 W for single core chips or 25 W for dual core chips.

== Desktop processors ==
=== Phenom series ===
==== "Agena" (B2/B3, 65 nm, Quad-core) ====
- All models support: MMX, SSE, SSE2, SSE3, SSE4a, ABM, Enhanced 3DNow!, NX bit, AMD64, Cool'n'Quiet, AMD-V
- Memory support: DDR2 SDRAM up to PC2-8500

Model number	Step.	Clock speed	L2 cache	L3 cache	Hyper Transport	Multi (Note: The clock multiplier applies to the 200 MHz HyperTransport base clock.)	Voltage	TDP	Socket	Release date	Part number
Phenom X4 9100e	B2	1.8 GHz	4×512 KB	2 MB	1.6 GHz	9×	1.10–1.15 V	65 W	AM2+	March 27, 2008	HD9100OBJ4BGD
Phenom X4 9150e	B3	1.8 GHz	4×512 KB	2 MB	1.6 GHz	9×	1.075–1.125 V	65 W	AM2+	July 1, 2008	HD9150ODJ4BGH
Phenom X4 9350e	B3	2.0 GHz	4×512 KB	2 MB	1.8 GHz	10×	1.075–1.125 V	65 W	AM2+	July 1, 2008	HD9350ODJ4BGH
Phenom X4 9450e	B3	2.1 GHz	4×512 KB	2 MB	1.8 GHz	10.5×	1.075–1.125 V	65 W	AM2+	October, 2008	HD9450ODJ4BGH
Phenom X4 9500	B2	2.2 GHz	4×512 KB	2 MB	1.8 GHz	11×	1.15–1.25 V	95 W	AM2+	November 19, 2007	HD9500WCJ4BGD
Phenom X4 9550	B3	2.2 GHz	4×512 KB	2 MB	1.8 GHz	11×	1.15–1.25 V	95 W	AM2+	March 27, 2008	HD9550WCJ4BGH
Phenom X4 9600	B2	2.3 GHz	4×512 KB	2 MB	1.8 GHz	11.5×	1.15–1.25 V	95 W	AM2+	November 19, 2007	HD9600WCJ4BGD
Phenom X4 9600 Black Edition (Note: The Black Edition features an unlocked multiplier.)	B2	2.3 GHz	4×512 KB	2 MB	1.8 GHz	11.5×	1.15–1.25 V	95 W	AM2+	December 19, 2007	HD960ZWCJ4BGD
Phenom X4 9650	B3	2.3 GHz	4×512 KB	2 MB	1.8 GHz	11.5×	1.15–1.25 V	95 W	AM2+	March 27, 2008	HD9650WCJ4BGH
Phenom X4 9750	B3	2.4 GHz	4×512 KB	2 MB	1.8 GHz	12×	1.15–1.25 V	95 W	AM2+	March 27, 2008	HD9750WCJ4BGH
Phenom X4 9750	B3	2.4 GHz	4×512 KB	2 MB	1.8 GHz	12×	1.20–1.30 V	125 W	AM2+	March 27, 2008	HD9750XAJ4BGH
Phenom X4 9850	B3	2.5 GHz	4×512 KB	2 MB	2.0 GHz	12.5×	1.20–1.25 V	95 W	AM2+	October, 2008	HD9850WCJ4BGH
Phenom X4 9850	B3	2.5 GHz	4×512 KB	2 MB	2.0 GHz	12.5×	1.20–1.30 V	125 W	AM2+	July 1, 2008	HD9850XAJ4BGH
Phenom X4 9850 Black Edition	B3	2.5 GHz	4×512 KB	2 MB	2.0 GHz	12.5×	1.20–1.30 V	125 W	AM2+	March 27, 2008	HD985ZXAJ4BGH
Phenom X4 9950 Black Edition	B3	2.6 GHz	4×512 KB	2 MB	2.0 GHz	13×	1.20–1.30 V	125 W	AM2+	October, 2008	HD995ZXAJ4BGH
Phenom X4 9950 Black Edition	B3	2.6 GHz	4×512 KB	2 MB	2.0 GHz	13×	1.25–1.30 V	140 W	AM2+	July 1, 2008	HD995ZFAJ4BGH
Business Class
Phenom X4 9600B (Note: AMD Business Class processor, availability guaranteed for 24 months after release.)	B2	2.3 GHz	4×512 KB	2 MB	1.8 GHz	11.5×	1.20–1.25 V	95 W	AM2+	April 28, 2008	HD960BWCJ4BGD
Phenom X4 9600B	B3	2.3 GHz	4×512 KB	2 MB	1.8 GHz	11.5×	1.20–1.25 V	95 W	AM2+	August 15, 2008	HD960BWCJ4BGH
Phenom X4 9750B	B3	2.4 GHz	4×512 KB	2 MB	1.8 GHz	12×	1.20–1.25 V	95 W	AM2+	August 15, 2008	HD975BWCJ4BGH
Phenom X4 9850B	B3	2.5 GHz	4×512 KB	2 MB	1.8 GHz	12.5×	1.225–1.25 V	95 W	AM2+	August 15, 2008	HD985BWCJ4BGH

==== "Toliman" (B2/B3, 65 nm, Tri-core) ====
- Chip harvests from Agena with one core disabled
- All models support: MMX, SSE, SSE2, SSE3, SSE4a, ABM, Enhanced 3DNow!, NX bit, AMD64, Cool'n'Quiet, AMD-V
- Memory support: DDR2 SDRAM up to PC2-8500

Model number	Step.	Clock speed	L2 cache	L3 cache	Hyper Transport	Multi	Voltage	TDP	Socket	Release date	Part number
Phenom X3 8250e	B3	1.9 GHz	3×512 KB	2 MB	1.6 GHz	9.5×	1.125–1.20 V	65 W	AM2+	September 8, 2008	HD8250ODJ3BGH
Phenom X3 8400	B2	2.1 GHz	3×512 KB	2 MB	1.8 GHz	10.5×	1.20–1.25 V	95 W	AM2+	March 27, 2008	HD8400WCJ3BGD
Phenom X3 8450	B3	2.1 GHz	3×512 KB	2 MB	1.8 GHz	10.5×	1.20–1.25 V	95 W	AM2+	April 23, 2008	HD8450WCJ3BGH
Phenom X3 8450e	B3	2.1 GHz	3×512 KB	2 MB	1.8 GHz	10.5×	1.125–1.20 V	65 W	AM2+	September 8, 2008	HD8450ODJ3BGH
Phenom X3 8550	B3	2.2 GHz	3×512 KB	2 MB	1.8 GHz	11×	1.20–1.25 V	95 W	AM2+	April 23, 2008	HD8550WCJ3BGH
Phenom X3 8600	B2	2.3 GHz	3×512 KB	2 MB	1.8 GHz	11.5×	1.20–1.25 V	95 W	AM2+	March 27, 2008	HD8600WCJ3BGD
Phenom X3 8650	B3	2.3 GHz	3×512 KB	2 MB	1.8 GHz	11.5×	1.20–1.25 V	95 W	AM2+	April 23, 2008	HD8650WCJ3BGH
Phenom X3 8750	B3	2.4 GHz	3×512 KB	2 MB	1.8 GHz	12×	1.20–1.25 V	95 W	AM2+	April 23, 2008	HD8750WCJ3BGH
Phenom X3 8750 Black Edition	B3	2.4 GHz	3×512 KB	2 MB	1.8 GHz	12×	1.20–1.25 V	95 W	AM2+	September 8, 2008	HD875ZWCJ3BGH
Phenom X3 8850	B3	2.5 GHz	3×512 KB	2 MB	1.8 GHz	12.5×	1.20–1.25 V	95 W	AM2+	October 21, 2008	HD8850WCJ3BGH
Business Class
Phenom X3 8600B	B2	2.3 GHz	3×512 KB	2 MB	1.8 GHz	11.5×	1.25 V	95 W	AM2+	April 28, 2008	HD860BWCJ3BGD
Phenom X3 8600B	B3	2.3 GHz	3×512 KB	2 MB	1.8 GHz	11.5×	1.25 V	95 W	AM2+	August 15, 2008	HD860BWCJ3BGH
Phenom X3 8750B	B3	2.4 GHz	3×512 KB	2 MB	1.8 GHz	12×	1.25 V	95 W	AM2+	August 15, 2008	HD875BWCJ3BGH

=== Phenom II series ===
==== "Thuban" (E0, 45 nm, Hexa-core) ====
- All models support: MMX, SSE, SSE2, SSE3, SSE4a, ABM, Enhanced 3DNow!, NX bit, AMD64, Cool'n'Quiet, AMD-V, Turbo Core (AMD equivalent of Intel Turbo Boost)
- Memory support: DDR2 SDRAM up to PC2-8500, DDR3 SDRAM up to PC3-10600 (Socket AM3 only)

Model Number	Step.	Clock speed	Turbo speed	L2 cache	L3 cache	Hyper Transport	Multi	Voltage	TDP	Socket	Release date	Part number
Phenom II X6 1035T	E0	2.6 GHz	3.1 GHz	6×512 KB	6 MB	2.0 GHz	13×	0.975–1.425 V	95 W	AM3	May 2010 (OEM)	HDT35TWFK6DGR
Phenom II X6 1045T	E0	2.7 GHz	3.2 GHz	6×512 KB	6 MB	2.0 GHz	13.5×	0.975–1.425 V	95 W	AM3	September 2010 (OEM)	HDT45TWFK6DGR
Phenom II X6 1055T	E0	2.8 GHz	3.3 GHz	6×512 KB	6 MB	2.0 GHz	14×	1.0–1.475 V	125 W	AM3	April 27, 2010	HDT55TFBK6DGR
Phenom II X6 1055T	E0	2.8 GHz	3.3 GHz	6×512 KB	6 MB	2.0 GHz	14×	0.975–1.425 V	95 W	AM3	May, 2010	HDT55TWFK6DGR
Phenom II X6 1065T	E0	2.9 GHz	3.4 GHz	6×512 KB	6 MB	2.0 GHz	14.5×	1.0–1.475 V	95 W	AM3	December 7, 2010	HDT65TWFK6DGR
Phenom II X6 1075T	E0	3.0 GHz	3.5 GHz	6×512 KB	6 MB	2.0 GHz	15×	1.0–1.475 V	125 W	AM3	September 21, 2010	HDT75TFBK6DGR
Phenom II X6 1075T; Black Edition	E0	3.0 GHz	3.5 GHz	6×512 KB	6 MB	2.0 GHz	15×	1.0–1.475 V	125 W	AM3	May / beginning of June 2010	HDT75ZFBK6DGR
Phenom II X6 1090T; Black Edition	E0	3.2 GHz	3.6 GHz	6×512 KB	6 MB	2.0 GHz	16×	1.0–1.475 V	125 W	AM3	April 27, 2010	HDT90ZFBK6DGR
Phenom II X6 1100T; Black Edition	E0	3.3 GHz	3.7 GHz	6×512 KB	6 MB	2.0 GHz	16.5×	1.0–1.475 V	125 W	AM3	December 7, 2010	HDE00ZFBK6DGR

==== "Zosma" (E0, 45 nm, Quad-core) ====
- Chip harvests from Thuban with two cores disabled
- All models support: MMX, SSE, SSE2, SSE3, SSE4a, ABM, Enhanced 3DNow!, NX bit, AMD64, Cool'n'Quiet, AMD-V, Turbo Core (AMD equivalent of Intel Turbo Boost)
- Memory support: DDR2 SDRAM up to PC2-8500, DDR3 SDRAM up to PC3-10600 (Socket AM3 only)

Model Number	Step.	Clock speed	Turbo speed	L2 cache	L3 cache	Hyper Transport	Multi	Voltage	TDP	Socket	Release date	Part number
Phenom II X4 650T	E0	2.7 GHz	3.2 GHz	4×512 KB	4 MB	2.0 GHz	13.5×	0.825–1.400 V	95 W	AM3	2011 (OEM)	HD650TWFK4FGR
Phenom II X4 840T	E0	2.9 GHz	3.2 GHz	4×512 KB	6 MB	2.0 GHz	14.5×	0.825–1.400 V	95 W	AM3	Q4 2010 (OEM)	HD840TWFK4DGR
Phenom II X4 960T; Black Edition	E0	3.0 GHz	3.4 GHz	4×512 KB	6 MB	2.0 GHz	15×	0.825–1.400 V	95 W	AM3	Q4 2010 (OEM)	HD96ZTWFK4DGR
Phenom II X4 960T	E0	3.0 GHz	3.4 GHz	4×512 KB	6 MB	2.0 GHz	15×	0.825–1.400 V	125 W	AM3	Q4 2010 (OEM)	HD960TFBK4DGR
Phenom II X4 970; Black Edition	E0	3.5 GHz	-	4×512 KB	6 MB	2.0 GHz	17.5×	0.825–1.400 V	125 W	AM3	Q4 2010 (OEM)	HDZ970FBK4DGR

==== "Deneb" (C2/C3, 45 nm, Quad-core) ====
- All models support: MMX, SSE, SSE2, SSE3, SSE4a, ABM, Enhanced 3DNow!, NX bit, AMD64, Cool'n'Quiet, AMD-V
- Memory support: DDR2 SDRAM up to PC2-8500, DDR3 SDRAM up to PC3-10600 (Socket AM3 only)

Model number	Step.	Clock speed	L2 cache	L3 cache	Hyper Transport	Multi	Voltage	TDP	Socket	Release date	Part number
Phenom II X4 805	C2	2.5 GHz	4×512 KB	4 MB	2.0 GHz	12.5×	0.875–1.425 V	95 W	AM3	February 9, 2009	HDX805WFK4FGI
Phenom II X4 810	C2	2.6 GHz	4×512 KB	4 MB	2.0 GHz	13×	0.875–1.425 V	95 W	AM3	February 9, 2009	HDX810WFK4FGI
Phenom II X4 820	C2	2.8 GHz	4×512 KB	4 MB	2.0 GHz	14×	0.9–1.425 V	95 W	AM3	Q3, 2009	HDX820WFK4FGI
Phenom II X4 830	C3	2.8 GHz	4×512 KB	6 MB	2.0 GHz	14×	0.9–1.425 V	95 W	AM3	Q3 2010 (OEM)	HDX830WFK4DGM
Phenom II X4 900e	C2	2.4 GHz	4×512 KB	6 MB	2.0 GHz	12×	0.850–1.250 V	65 W	AM3	June 2, 2009	HD900EOCK4DGI
Phenom II X4 905e	C2	2.5 GHz	4×512 KB	6 MB	2.0 GHz	12.5×	0.825–1.250 V	65 W	AM3	June 2, 2009	HD905EOCK4DGI
Phenom II X4 910	C2	2.6 GHz	4×512 KB	6 MB	2.0 GHz	13×	0.875–1.425 V	95 W	AM3	February 9, 2009	HDX910WFK4DGI
Phenom II X4 910e	C3	2.6 GHz	4×512 KB	6 MB	2.0 GHz	13×	0.850–1.250 V	65 W	AM3	January 25, 2010	HD910EOCK4DGM
Phenom II X4 920	C2	2.8 GHz	4×512 KB	6 MB	1.8 GHz	14×	0.875–1.425 V	125 W	AM2+	January 8, 2009	HDX920XCJ4DGI
Phenom II X4 925	C2	2.8 GHz	4×512 KB	6 MB	2.0 GHz	14×	0.850–1.425 V	95 W	AM3	May 11, 2009	HDX925WFK4DGI
Phenom II X4 925	C3	2.8 GHz	4×512 KB	6 MB	2.0 GHz	14×	0.9–1.400 V	95 W	AM3	November 4, 2009	HDX925WFK4DGM
Phenom II X4 940 Black Edition	C2	3.0 GHz	4×512 KB	6 MB	1.8 GHz	15×	0.875–1.425 V	125 W	AM2+	January 8, 2009	HDZ940XCJ4DGI
Phenom II X4 945	C2	3.0 GHz	4×512 KB	6 MB	2.0 GHz	15×	1.150–1.425 V	125 W	AM3	April 23, 2009	HDX945FBK4DGI
Phenom II X4 945	C2	3.0 GHz	4×512 KB	6 MB	2.0 GHz	15×	0.850–1.425 V	95 W	AM3	June 12, 2009	HDX945WFK4DGI
Phenom II X4 945	C3	3.0 GHz	4×512 KB	6 MB	2.0 GHz	15×	0.850–1.400 V	95 W	AM3	November 4, 2009	HDX945WFK4DGM
Phenom II X4 955	C2	3.2 GHz	4×512 KB	6 MB	2.0 GHz	16×	0.850–1.400 V	125 W	AM3	April 2009	HDX955FBK4DGI
Phenom II X4 955	C3	3.2 GHz	4×512 KB	6 MB	2.0 GHz	16×	0.850–1.400 V	125 W	AM3	November 4, 2009	HDX955FBK4DGM
Phenom II X4 955	C3	3.2 GHz	4×512 KB	6 MB	2.0 GHz	16×	0.850–1.400 V	95 W	AM3	Q2 2010	HDX955WFK4DGM
Phenom II X4 955 Black Edition	C2	3.2 GHz	4×512 KB	6 MB	2.0 GHz	16×	0.875–1.425 V	125 W	AM3	April 23, 2009	HDZ955FBK4DGI
Phenom II X4 955 Black Edition	C3	3.2 GHz	4×512 KB	6 MB	2.0 GHz	16×	0.825–1.425 V	125 W	AM3	December, 2009	HDZ955FBK4DGM
Phenom II X4 965 Black Edition	C2	3.4 GHz	4×512 KB	6 MB	2.0 GHz	17×	0.850–1.425 V	140 W	AM3	August 13, 2009	HDZ965FBK4DGI
Phenom II X4 965 Black Edition	C3	3.4 GHz	4×512 KB	6 MB	2.0 GHz	17×	0.825–1.400 V	125 W	AM3	November 4, 2009	HDZ965FBK4DGM
Phenom II X4 970 Black Edition	C3	3.5 GHz	4×512 KB	6 MB	2.0 GHz	17.5×	0.825–1.400 V	125 W	AM3	September 21, 2010	HDZ970FBK4DGM
Phenom II X4 975 Black Edition	C3	3.6 GHz	4×512 KB	6 MB	2.0 GHz	18×	0.825–1.400 V	125 W	AM3	January 4, 2011	HDZ975FBK4DGM
Phenom II X4 980 Black Edition	C3	3.7 GHz	4×512 KB	6 MB	2.0 GHz	18.5×	0.825–1.400 V	125 W	AM3	May 3, 2011	HDZ980FBK4DGM
Business Class
Phenom II X4 B93	C2	2.8 GHz	4×512 KB	6 MB	2.0 GHz	14×	0.800–1.425 V	95 W	AM3	October 2009	HDXB93WFK4DGI
Phenom II X4 B95	C2	3.0 GHz	4×512 KB	6 MB	2.0 GHz	15×	0.800–1.425 V	95 W	AM3	October 2009	HDXB95WFK4DGI
Phenom II X4 B97	C3	3.2 GHz	4×512 KB	6 MB	2.0 GHz	16×	0.800–1.425 V	95 W	AM3	May 11, 2010	HDXB97WFK4DGM
Phenom II X4 B99	C3	3.3 GHz	4×512 KB	6 MB	2.0 GHz	16.5×	0.800–1.425 V	95 W	AM3	2011	HDXB99WFK4DGM

==== "Propus" (C3, 45 nm, Quad-core) ====
- Chip harvests from Deneb with L3 cache disabled
- All models support: MMX, SSE, SSE2, SSE3, SSE4a, ABM, Enhanced 3DNow!, NX bit, AMD64, Cool'n'Quiet, AMD-V
- Memory support: DDR2 SDRAM up to PC2-8500 (DDR2-1066 MHz), DDR3 SDRAM up to PC3-10600 (DDR3-1333 MHz) (Socket AM3 only)

Model number	Step.	Clock speed	L2 cache	Hyper Transport	Multi	Voltage	TDP	Socket	Release date	Part number
Phenom II X4 840	C3	3.2 GHz	4×512 KB	2.0 GHz	16×	1.05–1.4 V	95 W	AM3	January 4, 2011 (OEM)	HDX840WFK42GM
Phenom II X4 850	C3	3.3 GHz	4×512 KB	2.0 GHz	16.5×	1.05–1.4 V	95 W	AM3	Q2 2011 (OEM)	HDX850WFK42GM

==== "Heka" (C2/C3, 45 nm, Tri-core) ====
- Chip harvests from Deneb with one core disabled
- All models support: MMX, SSE, SSE2, SSE3, SSE4a, ABM, Enhanced 3DNow!, NX bit, AMD64, Cool'n'Quiet, AMD-V
- Memory support: DDR2 SDRAM up to PC2-8500, DDR3 SDRAM up to PC3-10600 (Socket AM3 only)
- On some Heka triple core processors e.g. 720 BE, the fourth disabled core can be enabled, effectively providing a quad core processor for the price of a triple core. This however does not work on all the processors with one core disabled.

Model number	Step.	Clock speed	L2 cache	L3 cache	Hyper Transport	Multi	Voltage	TDP	Socket	Release date	Part number
Phenom II X3 700e	C2	2.4 GHz	3×512 KB	6 MB	2.0 GHz	12×	0.825–1.25 V	65 W	AM3	June 2, 2009	HD700EOCK3DGI
Phenom II X3 705e	C2	2.5 GHz	3×512 KB	6 MB	2.0 GHz	12.5×	0.800–1.25 V	65 W	AM3	June 2, 2009	HD705EOCK3DGI
Phenom II X3 710	C2	2.6 GHz	3×512 KB	6 MB	2.0 GHz	13×	0.875–1.325 V	95 W	AM3	February 9, 2009	HDX710WFK3DGI
Phenom II X3 715 Black Edition	C2	2.8 GHz	3×512 KB	6 MB	1.8 GHz	14×	0.875–1.325 V	95 W	AM2+	??	HDZ715WCJ3DGI
Phenom II X3 720	C2	2.8 GHz	3×512 KB	6 MB	2.0 GHz	14×	0.875–1.325 V	95 W	AM3	??	HDX720WFK3DGI
Phenom II X3 720 Black Edition	C2	2.8 GHz	3×512 KB	6 MB	2.0 GHz	14×	0.850–1.325 V	95 W	AM3	February 9, 2009	HDZ720WFK3DGI
Phenom II X3 740 Black Edition	C2	3.0 GHz	3×512 KB	6 MB	2.0 GHz	15×	0.850–1.425 V	95 W	AM3	September, 2009	HDZ740WFK3DGI
Business Class
Phenom II X3 B73	C2	2.8 GHz	3×512 KB	6 MB	2.0 GHz	14×	0.800–1.325 V	95 W	AM3	October 2009	HDXB73WFK3DGI
Phenom II X3 B75	C2	3.0 GHz	3×512 KB	6 MB	2.0 GHz	15×	0.800–1.425 V	95 W	AM3	October 2009	HDXB75WFK3DGI
Phenom II X3 B75	C3	3.0 GHz	3x512 KB	6 MB	2.0 GHz	15x	0.800-1.425 V	95 W	AM3	??	HDXB75WFK3DGM
Phenom II X3 B77	C3	3.2 GHz	3×512 KB	6 MB	2.0 GHz	16×	0.800–1.425 V	95 W	AM3	May 11, 2010	HDXB77WFK3DGM

==== "Callisto" (C2/C3, 45 nm, Dual-core) ====
- Chip harvests from Deneb with two cores disabled
- All models support: MMX, SSE, SSE2, SSE3, SSE4a, ABM, Enhanced 3DNow!, NX bit, AMD64, Cool'n'Quiet, AMD-V
- Memory support: DDR2 SDRAM up to PC2-8500, DDR3 SDRAM up to PC3-10600 (Socket AM3 only)
- On some Callisto dual core processors e.g. 555 BE, the two disabled cores can be enabled, effectively providing a quad core processor for the price of a dual core. This however does not work on all the processors with two cores disabled.

Model number	Step.	Clock speed	L2 cache	L3 cache	Hyper Transport	Multi	Voltage	TDP	Socket	Release date	Part number
Phenom II X2 545	C2	3.0 GHz	2×512 KB	6 MB	2.0 GHz	15×	0.875–1.425 V	80 W	AM3	June 1, 2009	HDX545WFK2DGI
Phenom II X2 545	C3	3.0 GHz	2×512 KB	6 MB	2.0 GHz	15×	0.900–1.40 V	80 W	AM3	November 4, 2009	HDX545WFK2DGM
Phenom II X2 550 Black Edition	C2	3.1 GHz	2×512 KB	6 MB	2.0 GHz	15.5×	0.850–1.425 V	80 W	AM3	June 1, 2009	HDZ550WFK2DGI
Phenom II X2 550	C3	3.1 GHz	2×512 KB	6 MB	2.0 GHz	15.5×	0.875–1.40 V	80 W	AM3	November 4, 2009	HDX550WFK2DGM
Phenom II X2 555 Black Edition	C3	3.2 GHz	2×512 KB	6 MB	2.0 GHz	16×	0.875–1.40 V	80 W	AM3	January 25, 2010	HDZ555WFK2DGM
Phenom II X2 560 Black Edition	C3	3.3 GHz	2×512 KB	6 MB	2.0 GHz	16.5×	0.875–1.40 V	80 W	AM3	September 21, 2010	HDZ560WFK2DGM
Phenom II X2 565 Black Edition	C3	3.4 GHz	2×512 KB	6 MB	2.0 GHz	17×	0.875–1.40 V	80 W	AM3	December 7, 2010	HDZ565WFK2DGM
Phenom II X2 570 Black Edition	C3	3.5 GHz	2×512 KB	6 MB	2.0 GHz	17.5×	0.875–1.40 V	80 W	AM3	May 3, 2011	HDZ570WFK2DGM
Business Class
Phenom II X2 B53	C3	2.8 GHz	2×512 KB	6 MB	2.2 GHz	14×	0.80–1.425 V	80 W	AM3	October 2009	HDXB53WFK2DGM
Phenom II X2 B55	C3	3.0 GHz	2×512 KB	6 MB	2.2 GHz	15×	0.775–1.425 V	80 W	AM3	October 2009	HDXB55WFK2DGM
Phenom II X2 B57	C3	3.2 GHz	2×512 KB	6 MB	2.2 GHz	16×	0.775–1.425 V	80 W	AM3	May 11, 2010	HDXB57WFK2DGM
Phenom II X2 B59	C3	3.4 GHz	2×512 KB	6 MB	2.2 GHz	17×	0.775–1.425 V	80 W	AM3	2011	HDXB59WFK2DGM
Phenom II X2 B60	C3	3.5 GHz	2×512 KB	6 MB	2.2 GHz	17.5×	0.775–1.425 V	80 W	AM3	2011	HDXB60WFK2DGM

==== "Regor" (C3, 45 nm, Dual-core) ====
- Most Regor-based processors feature double the L2 cache per core (1 MB) as other Athlon II and Phenom II processors.
- All models support: MMX, SSE, SSE2, SSE3, SSE4a, ABM, Enhanced 3DNow!, NX bit, AMD64, Cool'n'Quiet, AMD-V
- Memory support: DDR2 SDRAM up to PC2-8500, DDR3 SDRAM up to PC3-10600 (DDR3-1333 MHz) (Socket AM3 only)

Model number	Step.	Clock speed	L2 cache	Hyper Transport	Multi	Voltage	TDP	Socket	Release date	Part number
Phenom II X2 511	C3	3.4 GHz	2×1 MB	2.0 GHz	17×	0.825–1.40 V	65 W	AM3	January 2011	HDX511OCK23GM
Phenom II X2 521	C3	3.5 GHz	2×1 MB	2.0 GHz	17.5×	0.825–1.40 V	65 W	AM3	Q2 2011	HDX521OCK23GM

==== Phenom II 42 TWKR (C2, 45 nm, Quad-core, Limited Edition) ====
AMD released a limited edition Deneb-based processor to extreme overclockers and partners. Fewer than 100 were made.

The "42" officially represents four cores running at 2 GHz, but is also a reference to the answer to life, the universe, and everything from The Hitchhiker's Guide to the Galaxy.

Model number	Step.	Clock speed	L2 cache	L3 cache	Hyper Transport	Multi	Voltage	TDP	Socket	Release date	Part number
Phenom II 42 TWKR Black Edition	C2	2.0+	4×512 KB	6 MB	1.8 GHz	10–35×	1.150–1.425 V	??	AM3	June, 2009	Not for sale

== Mobile processors ==
=== Turion II Ultra mobile processors (Phenom-based) ===
==== "Caspian" (45 nm, Dual-core) ====
- Based on the AMD K10 microarchitecture
- All models support: MMX, SSE, SSE2, SSE3, SSE4a, ABM, Enhanced 3DNow!, NX bit, AMD64, PowerNow!, AMD-V

Model number	Clock speed	L2 cache	FPU width	Hyper Transport	Multi	TDP	Socket	Release date	Part number
Turion II Ultra M600	2.4 GHz	2 × 1 MB	128-bit	1.8 GHz	12×	35 W	Socket S1G3	September 10, 2009	TMM600DBO23GQ
Turion II Ultra M620	2.5 GHz	2 × 1 MB	128-bit	1.8 GHz	12.5×	35 W	Socket S1G3	September 10, 2009	TMM620DBO23GQ
Turion II Ultra M640	2.6 GHz	2 × 1 MB	128-bit	1.8 GHz	13×	35 W	Socket S1G3	September 10, 2009	TMM640DBO23GQ
Turion II Ultra M660	2.7 GHz	2 × 1 MB	128-bit	1.8 GHz	13.5×	35 W	Socket S1G3	September 10, 2009	TMM660DBO23GQ

=== Turion II mobile processors (Phenom-based) ===
==== "Caspian" (45 nm, Dual-core) ====
- Based on the AMD K10 microarchitecture
- All models support: MMX, SSE, SSE2, SSE3, SSE4a, ABM, Enhanced 3DNow!, NX bit, AMD64, PowerNow!, AMD-V

Model number	Clock speed	L2 cache	FPU width	Hyper Transport	Multi	TDP	Socket	Release date	Part number
Turion II M500	2.2 GHz	2 × 512 KB	128-bit	1.8 GHz	11×	35 W	Socket S1G3	September 10, 2009	TMM500DBO22GQ
Turion II M520	2.3 GHz	2 × 512 KB	128-bit	1.8 GHz	11.5×	35 W	Socket S1G3	September 10, 2009	TMM520DBO22GQ
Turion II M540	2.4 GHz	2 × 512 KB	128-bit	1.8 GHz	12×	35 W	Socket S1G3	September 10, 2009	TMM540DBO22GQ
Turion II M560	2.5 GHz	2 × 512 KB	128-bit	1.8 GHz	12×	35 W	Socket S1G3	April 2010	TMM560DBO22GQ

=== Phenom II mobile processors ===
- Based on the AMD K10 microarchitecture
- All models support: MMX, SSE, SSE2, SSE3, SSE4a, ABM, Enhanced 3DNow!, NX bit, AMD64, Cool'n'Quiet, AMD-V
- Memory support: DDR3 SDRAM, DDR3L SDRAM
- Unlike Phenom II desktop processors, Phenom II mobile processors lack L3 cache.

==== "Champlain" (45 nm, Quad-core) ====
Model number	Clock speed	L2 cache	FPU width	Hyper Transport	Multi	TDP	Socket	Release date	Part number
Phenom II P920	1.6 GHz	4 × 512 KB	128-bit	1.8 GHz	8×	25 W	Socket S1G4	May 12, 2010	HMP920SGR42GM
Phenom II P940	1.7 GHz	4 × 512 KB	128-bit	1.8 GHz	8.5×	25 W	Socket S1G4	October 4, 2010	HMP940SGR42GM
Phenom II P960	1.8 GHz	4 × 512 KB	128-bit	1.8 GHz	9×	25 W	Socket S1G4	October 19, 2010	HMP960SGR42GM
Phenom II N930	2.0 GHz	4 × 512 KB	128-bit	1.8 GHz	10×	35 W	Socket S1G4	May 12, 2010	HMN930DCR42GM
Phenom II N950	2.1 GHz	4 × 512 KB	128-bit	1.8 GHz	10.5×	35 W	Socket S1G4	October 4, 2010	HMN950DCR42GM
Phenom II N970	2.2 GHz	4 × 512 KB	128-bit	1.8 GHz	11×	35 W	Socket S1G4	January 4, 2011	HMN970DCR42GM
Phenom II X920 BE	2.3 GHz	4 × 512 KB	128-bit	1.8 GHz	11.5×	45 W	Socket S1G4	May 12, 2010	HMX920HIR42GM
Phenom II X940 BE	2.4 GHz	4 × 512 KB	128-bit	1.8 GHz	12×	45 W	Socket S1G4	January 4, 2011	HMX940HIR42GM

==== "Champlain" (45 nm, Triple-core) ====
Model number	Clock speed	L2 cache	FPU width	Hyper Transport	Multi	TDP	Socket	Release date	Part number
Phenom II P820	1.8 GHz	3 × 512 KB	128-bit	1.8 GHz	9×	25 W	Socket S1G4	May 12, 2010	HMP820SGR32GM
Phenom II P840	1.9 GHz	3 × 512 KB	128-bit	1.8 GHz	9.5×	25 W	Socket S1G4	October 4, 2010	HMP840SGR32GM
Phenom II P860	2.0 GHz	3 × 512 KB	128-bit	1.8 GHz	10×	25 W	Socket S1G4	October 4, 2010	HMP860SGR32GM
Phenom II N830	2.1 GHz	3 × 512 KB	128-bit	1.8 GHz	10.5×	35 W	Socket S1G4	May 12, 2010	HMN830DCR32GM
Phenom II N850	2.2 GHz	3 × 512 KB	128-bit	1.8 GHz	11×	35 W	Socket S1G4	October 4, 2010	HMN850DCR32GM
Phenom II N870	2.3 GHz	3 × 512 KB	128-bit	1.8 GHz	11.5×	35 W	Socket S1G4	January 4, 2011	HMN870DCR32GM

==== "Champlain" (45 nm, Dual-core) ====
Model number	Clock speed	L2 cache	FPU width	Hyper Transport	Multi	TDP	Socket	Release date	Part number
Phenom II P650	2.6 GHz	2 × 1 MB	128-bit	1.8 GHz	13×	25 W	Socket S1G4	October 19, 2010	HMP650SGR23GM
Phenom II N620	2.8 GHz	2 × 1 MB	128-bit	1.8 GHz	14×	35 W	Socket S1G4	May 12, 2010	HMN620DCR23GM
Phenom II N640	2.9 GHz	2 × 1 MB	128-bit	1.8 GHz	14.5×	35 W	Socket S1G4	October 4, 2010	HMN640DCR23GM
Phenom II N660	3.0 GHz	2 × 1 MB	128-bit	1.8 GHz	15×	35 W	Socket S1G4	January 4, 2011	HMN660DCR23GM
Phenom II X620 BE	3.1 GHz	2 × 1 MB	128-bit	1.8 GHz	15.5×	45 W	Socket S1G4	May 12, 2010	HMX620HIR23GM
Phenom II X640 BE	3.2 GHz	2 × 1 MB	128-bit	1.8 GHz	16×	45 W	Socket S1G4	May 10, 2011	HMX640HIR23GM

=== Turion II (Phenom II-based) ===
- Based on the AMD K10 microarchitecture
- All models support: MMX, SSE, SSE2, SSE3, SSE4a, ABM, Enhanced 3DNow!, NX bit, AMD64, Cool'n'Quiet, AMD-V
- Memory support: DDR3 SDRAM, DDR3L SDRAM

==== "Champlain" (45 nm, Dual-core) ====
Model number	Clock speed	L2 cache	FPU width	Hyper Transport	Multi	TDP	Socket	Release date	Part number
Turion II P520	2.3 GHz	2 × 1 MB	128-bit	1.8 GHz	11.5×	25 W	Socket S1G4	May 12, 2010	TMP520SGR23GM
Turion II P540	2.4 GHz	2 × 1 MB	128-bit	1.8 GHz	12×	25 W	Socket S1G4	October 4, 2010	TMP540SGR23GM
Turion II P560	2.5 GHz	2 × 1 MB	128-bit	1.8 GHz	12.5×	25 W	Socket S1G4	October 19, 2010	TMP560SGR23GM
Turion II N530	2.5 GHz	2 × 1 MB	128-bit	1.8 GHz	12.5×	35 W	Socket S1G4	May 12, 2010	TMN530DCR23GM
Turion II N550	2.6 GHz	2 × 1 MB	128-bit	1.8 GHz	13×	35 W	Socket S1G4	October 4, 2010	TMN550DCR23GM
Turion II N570	2.7 GHz	2 × 1 MB	128-bit	1.8 GHz	13.5×	35 W	Socket S1G4	January 4, 2011	TMN570DCR23GM

=== Turion II Neo (Phenom II-based) ===
- Based on the AMD K10 microarchitecture
- All models support: MMX, SSE, SSE2, SSE3, SSE4a, ABM, Enhanced 3DNow!, NX bit, AMD64, Cool'n'Quiet, AMD-V
- Memory support: DDR3 SDRAM, DDR3L SDRAM

==== "Geneva" (45 nm, Dual-core) ====
Model number	Clock speed	L2 cache	FPU width	Hyper Transport	Multi	TDP	Socket	Release date	Part number
Turion II Neo N40L	1.5 GHz	2 × 1 MB	128-bit	1.6 GHz	7.5×	15 W	Socket ASB2	April 26, 2010	TEN40LGAV23GME
Turion II K625	1.5 GHz	2 × 1 MB	128-bit	1.6 GHz	7.5×	15 W	Socket ASB2	May 12, 2010	TMK625GAV23GM
Turion II K645	1.6 GHz	2 × 1 MB	128-bit	1.6 GHz	8×	15 W	Socket ASB2	January 4, 2011	TMK645GAV23GM
Turion II K665	1.7 GHz	2 × 1 MB	128-bit	1.6 GHz	8.5×	15 W	Socket ASB2	May 12, 2010	TMK665GAV23GM
Turion II K685	1.8 GHz	2 × 1 MB	128-bit	1.6 GHz	9×	15 W	Socket ASB2	January 4, 2011	TMK685GAV23GM
Turion II Neo N54L	2.2 GHz	2 × 1 MB	128-bit	1.6 GHz	11×	25 W	Socket ASB2	May 2010	TEN54LSDV23GME

== Embedded processors ==
=== V-series (Phenom II-based) ===
- Based on the AMD K10 microarchitecture
- Only 64 bit FPU
- All models support: MMX, SSE, SSE2, SSE3, SSE4a, ABM, Enhanced 3DNow!, NX bit, AMD64, Cool'n'Quiet, AMD-V
- Memory support: DDR3 SDRAM, DDR3L SDRAM

==== "Champlain" (45 nm, Single-core) ====
Model number	Clock speed	L2 cache	FPU width	Hyper Transport	Multi	TDP	Socket	Release date	Part number
V120	2.2 GHz	512 KB	64-bit	1.6 GHz	11×	25 W	S1G4	May 12, 2010	VMV120SGR12GM
V140	2.3 GHz	512 KB	64-bit	1.6 GHz	11.5×	25 W	S1G4	October 4, 2010	VMV140SGR12GM
V160	2.4 GHz	512 KB	64-bit	1.6 GHz	12×	25 W	S1G4	January 4, 2011	VMV160SGR12GM

==== "Geneva" (45 nm, Single-core) ====
Model number	Clock speed	L2 cache	FPU width	Hyper Transport	Multi	TDP	Socket	Release date	Part number
V105	1.2 GHz	512 KB	64-bit	1.0 GHz	6×	9 W	ASB2	May 12, 2010	VMV105FDV12GM

== See also ==
- List of AMD Athlon II microprocessors
- AMD Phenom
- AMD K10
- List of AMD microprocessors
- Table of AMD processors
