= List of AMD FX processors =

AMD FX is a discontinued series of AMD microprocessors for personal computers. The following is a list of AMD FX brand microprocessors. Some APUs also carry an FX model name, but the term "FX" normally only refers to CPUs which are not just APUs with the iGPU disabled.

== Desktop CPUs ==
=== Athlon 64 Family (90–130 nm) ===
These processors were the first AMD CPUs to use the "FX" designation and identified the chip as being higher-performance. The frequency multiplier was unlocked in these chips.

==== SledgeHammer Core (130 nm) ====
- Socket 940
- L1 cache: 64 kb + 64 kb (data + instruction)
- L2 cache: 1024 kb (full speed)
- Instruction sets: MMX, SSE, SSE2, Enhanced 3DNow!, NX bit, AMD64
- Models: FX-51 (2.2 GHz) and FX-53 (2.4 GHz)

==== ClawHammer Core (130 nm) ====
- Socket 939
- L1 cache: 64 kb + 64 kb (data + instruction)
- L2 cache: 1024 kb (full speed)
- Instruction sets: MMX, SSE, SSE2, Enhanced 3DNow!, NX bit, AMD64
- Models: FX-53 (2.4 GHz) and FX-55 (2.6 GHz)

==== SanDiego Core (90 nm) ====
- Socket 939
- L1 cache: 64 kb + 64 kb (data + instruction)
- L2 cache: 1024 kb (full speed)
- Instruction sets: MMX, SSE, SSE2, SSE3, Enhanced 3DNow!, NX bit, AMD64
- Power management features: Cool'n'Quiet
- Models: FX-55 (2.6 GHz) and FX-57 (2.8 GHz)

==== Toledo Core (90 nm, dual-core) ====
- Socket 939
- L1 cache (per core): 64 kb + 64 kb (data + instruction)
- L2 cache (per core): 1024 kb (full speed)
- Instruction sets: MMX, SSE, SSE2, SSE3, Enhanced 3DNow!, NX bit, AMD64
- Power management features: Cool'n'Quiet
- Models: FX-60 (2.6 GHz)

==== Windsor Core (90 nm, dual-core) ====
- Socket AM2
- L1 cache (per core): 64 kb + 64 kb (data + instruction)
- L2 cache (per core): 1024 kb (full speed)
- Instruction sets: MMX, SSE, SSE2, SSE3, Enhanced 3DNow!, NX bit, AMD64, AMD-V
- Power management features: Cool'n'Quiet
- Models: FX-62 (2.8 GHz)

==== Windsor Core (90 nm, dual-core, dual-processor) ====
- Socket F
- L1 cache (per core): 64 kb + 64 kb (data + instruction)
- L2 cache (per core): 1024 kb (full speed)
- Instruction sets: MMX, SSE, SSE2, SSE3, Enhanced 3DNow!, NX bit, AMD64, AMD-V
- Power management features: Cool'n'Quiet
- Models: FX-70 (2.6 GHz), FX-72 (2.8 GHz), FX-74 (3.0 GHz)

=== Bulldozer Family (32 nm) ===
- All models binned from 8 logical cores with simple OROCHI die production, in 938 pins μPGA package AM3+ socket.
- All AMD FX microprocessors are unlocked and overclockable.
- Two Integers-Clusters (seen as logical cores from OS) in each Bulldozer Module.
- 4 Bulldozer modules within FX-8 series, 3 in FX-6 series, and 2 in FX-4 series.
- All models support up to 4 DIMMs of DDR3-1866 memory.

==== Bulldozer Core (Zambezi, 32 nm) ====
- Codenamed: Zambezi
- Transistors: ~1.6 billion (real node count)
- Die size: 319 mm^{2} (real measured up size)
- L1 data cache (per core): 16 kb
- L1 instruction cache (per module): 64 kb
- L2 cache (per module): 2048 kb
- All models support: MMX(+), SSE, SSE2, SSE3, SSSE3, SSE4.1, SSE4.2, 4a, NX bit, AMD64, AMD-V, IOMMU, AES, CLMUL, AVX, XOP, FMA4, F16C, ABM, Turbo Core 2.0, PowerNow!, ECC

Model	Step.	[Modules/FPUs] Cores/threads	Clock frequency (GHz)			L3 cache	HT clock (GHz)	Multiplier^{2}	Core voltage (V)	TDP (W)	Release date	Part number(s)	Release price (USD)
Model	Step.	[Modules/FPUs] Cores/threads	Base	Full-load turbo	Half-load turbo^{1}	L3 cache	HT clock (GHz)	Multiplier^{2}	Core voltage (V)	TDP (W)	Release date	Part number(s)	Release price (USD)
FX-4100	B2	[2] 4	3.6	3.7	3.8	8 MB	2.0	4–19×	0.775–1.425	95	Oct 12, 2011	FD4100WMW4KGU	$115
FX-4120	B2	[2] 4	3.9	4.0	4.1	8 MB	2.0	4–20.5×	0.775–1.425	95	2012	Cancelled	$122
FX-4130	B2	[2] 4	3.8	3.9	4.0	4 MB	2.0	4–20×	0.775–1.425	125	Aug 27, 2012	FD4130FRW4MGU	$125
FX-4150	B2	[2] 4	3.8	3.9	4.0	8 MB	2.2	4–20×	0.75–1.40	95; 125	Oct 2012	FD4150WMW4KGU; FD4150FRW4MGU	$137
FX-4170	B2	[2] 4	4.2	4.3	4.3	8 MB	2.2	4–21.5×	0.75–1.40	125	Feb 25, 2012	FD4170FRW4KGU	$119
FX-4200	B2	[4] 4	3.3	3.6	3.9	8 MB	2.2	7–19.5×	0.9625–1.4125	125	May 2012	FD4200FRW4KGU	$154
FX-6100	B2	[3] 6	3.3	3.6	3.9	8 MB	2.0	4–19.5×	0.775–1.425	95	Oct 12, 2011	FD6100WMW6KGU	$165
FX-6120	B2	[3] 6	3.6	3.9	4.2	8 MB	2.0	4–21×	0.775–1.425	95	Oct 2012	FD6120WMW6KGU	$155
FX-6130	B2	[3] 6	3.6	3.8	3.9	8 MB	2.0	4–19.5×	0.775–1.425	95	Oct 2012	FD6130FRW6KGU	$157
FX-6200	B2	[3] 6	3.8	4.0	4.1	8 MB	2.2	4–20.5×	0.75–1.40	125	Feb 25, 2012	FD6200FRW6KGU	$150
FX-8100	B2	[4] 8	2.8	3.1	3.7	8 MB	2.0	4–18.5×	0.775–1.425	95	Oct 30, 2011	FD8100WMW8KGU	$185
FX-8120	B2	[4] 8	3.1	3.4	4.0	8 MB	2.0	4–20×	0.775–1.425	95; 125	Oct 12, 2011	FD8120WMW8KGU; FD8120FRW8KGU	$205
FX-8140	B2	[4] 8	3.2	3.6	4.1	8 MB	2.2	4–20.5×	0.775–1.425	95	Oct 2012	FD8140WMW8KGU	$205
FX-8150	B2	[4] 8	3.6	3.9	4.2	8 MB	2.2	4–21×	0.775–1.425	125	Oct 12, 2011	FD8150FRW8KGU	$245
FX-8170	B2	[4] 8	3.9	4.2	4.5	8 MB	2.2	4–22.5×	0.75–1.45	125	2012	Cancelled	$275

==== Piledriver Core (Vishera, 32 nm) ====
- Codenamed: Vishera
- L1 data cache (per core): 16 kb
- L1 instruction cache (per module): 64 kb
- L2 cache (per module): 2048 kb
- All models support: MMX(+), SSE, SSE2, SSE3, SSSE3, SSE4.1, SSE4.2, SSE4a, NX bit, AMD64, AMD-V, IOMMU, AES, CLMUL, AVX, XOP, FMA3, FMA4, F16C, ABM, BMI1, TBM, Turbo Core 3.0, PowerNow!, EVP (Enhanced Virus Protection), ECC

Model	Step.	[Modules/FPUs] Cores/threads	Clock frequency (GHz)			L3 cache	HT clock (GHz)	Multiplier^{2}	Core voltage (V)	TDP (W)	Release date	Part number(s)	Release price (USD)
Model	Step.	[Modules/FPUs] Cores/threads	Base	Full-load turbo	Half-load turbo^{1}	L3 cache	HT clock (GHz)	Multiplier^{2}	Core voltage (V)	TDP (W)	Release date	Part number(s)	Release price (USD)
FX-4300	C0	[2] 4	3.8	3.9	4.0	4 MB	2.0	7.0–20.0×	0.8875–1.4125	95	Oct 23, 2012	FD4300WMW4MHK	$122
FX-4320	C0	[2] 4	4.0	4.1	4.2	4 MB	2.0	7.0–21.0×	?	95	Nov 2012	FD4320WMW4MHK	?
FX-4350	C0	[2] 4	4.2	?	4.3	8 MB	2.0	7.0–21.5×	0.8375–1.4125	125	Apr 30, 2013	FD4350FRW4KHK	$122
FX-6300	C0	[3] 6	3.5	3.8	4.1	8 MB	2.0	7.0–20.5×	0.9000–1.4250	95	Oct 23, 2012	FD6300WMW6KHK	$132
FX-6330	C0	[3] 6	3.6	3.9	4.2	8 MB	2.2	7.0–21.0×	0.8875-1.4250	95	Dec 2015	FD6330WMW6KHK	$110
FX-6350	C0	[3] 6	3.9	?	4.2	8 MB	2.0	7.0–21.0×	0.8750–1.4250	125	Apr 30, 2013	FD6350FRW6KHK	$132
FX-8300	C0	[4] 8	3.3	3.6	4.2	8 MB	2.2	7.0–21.0×	0.8250–1.3750	95	Dec 29, 2012	FD8300WMW8KHK	$129
FX-8310	C0	[4] 8	3.4	3.7	4.3	8 MB	2.2	7.0–21.5×	0.8375–1.4125	95	Sep 2, 2014	FD8310WMW8KHK	$110
FX-8320E	C0	[4] 8	3.2	3.5	4.0	8 MB	2.2	7.0–20.0×	0.8375–1.4125	95	Sep 2, 2014	FD832EWMW8KHK	$142
FX-8320	C0	[4] 8	3.5	3.7	4.0	8 MB	2.2	7.0–20.0×	0.9500–1.4250	125	Oct 23, 2012	FD8320FRW8KHK	$169
FX-8350	C0	[4] 8	4.0	4.1	4.2	8 MB	2.2	7.0–21.0×	0.8750–1.4250	125	Oct 23, 2012	FD8350FRW8KHK	$195
FX-8370E	C0	[4] 8	3.3	3.6	4.3	8 MB	2.2	7.0–21.5×	0.8250–1.3750	95	Sep 2, 2014	FD837EWMW8KHK	$194
FX-8370	C0	[4] 8	4.0	4.1	4.3	8 MB	2.2	7.0–21.5×	0.8625–1.4250	125	Sep 2, 2014	FD8370FRW8KHK	$194
FX-9370	C0	[4] 8	4.4	4.7		8 MB	2.2	7.0–23.5×	?	220	Jul 6, 2013	FD9370FHHKWOF; FD9370FHHKWOX^{5}	$576^{a}
FX-9590	C0	[4] 8	4.7	5.0		8 MB	2.2	7.0–25.0×	0.8875–1.5375	220	Jul 6, 2013	FD9590FHHKWOF; FD9590FHHKWOX^{5}	$920^{a}

== Notes ==
- AMD later re-used the FX designation for some processors in its socket FM2/FM2+ APU lineup.
- ^aThe FX-9590 and FX-9370 originally launched as OEM exclusive parts which retailers listed for $920 and $576 respectively. By October they were released to retail channels in a kit with a liquid cooler at $390 and $290.
1. All models support AMD Turbo Core, v2.0 for BULLDOZER and v3.0 for PILEDRIVER.
2. The clock multiplier is applied to the 200 MHz HyperTransport base clock.
3. A line of Socket F and Socket AM2 processors launched in 2006 were named Athlon 64 FX, the first being the AMD FX-60.
4. A Line of Phenom FX processors was revealed May 2007 and was branded the "FASN8" platform.
5. Sold with a liquid cooling kit.

== See also ==
- AMD FX
- List of AMD chipsets
- List of AMD accelerated processing units – desktop, mobile and ultra-low-power
- List of AMD Opteron processors – server
- Table of AMD processors
