= List of AMD Athlon XP processors =

The Athlon XP microprocessor from AMD is a seventh-generation 32-bit CPU targeted at the consumer market.

== Desktop CPU ==
=== Athlon XP "Palomino" (Model 6, 180 nm) ===
- CPU-ID: 6-6-0, 6-6-1, 6-6-2
- All models support: MMX, SSE, Enhanced 3DNow!

Model number	Frequency	L2-Cache	FSB	Multiplier	Voltage	TDP	Release date	Part number	Release price
Standard power
Athlon XP 1500+	1333 MHz	256 KB	266 MT/s	10x	1.75 V	60.0 W	October 9, 2001	AX1500DMT3C	$130
Athlon XP 1600+	1400 MHz	256 KB	266 MT/s	10.5x	1.75 V	62.8 W	October 9, 2001	AX1600DMT3C	$160
Athlon XP 1700+	1467 MHz	256 KB	266 MT/s	11x	1.75 V	64.0 W	October 9, 2001	AX1700DMT3C	$190
Athlon XP 1800+	1533 MHz	256 KB	266 MT/s	11.5x	1.75 V	66.0 W	October 9, 2001	AX1800DMT3C	$252
Athlon XP 1900+	1600 MHz	256 KB	266 MT/s	12x	1.75 V	68.0 W	November 5, 2001	AX1900DMT3C	$269
Athlon XP 2000+	1667 MHz	256 KB	266 MT/s	12.5x	1.75 V	70.0 W	January 7, 2002	AX2000DMT3C	$339
Athlon XP 2100+	1733 MHz	256 KB	266 MT/s	13x	1.75 V	72.0 W	March 13, 2002	AX2100DMT3C	$420
Low voltage
Athlon SFF 1000	1000 MHz	256 KB	200 MT/s	10x	1.60 V	35.0 W	?	AHL1000AUT3B	
Athlon SFF 1100	1100 MHz	256 KB	200 MT/s	11x	1.60 V	35.0 W	?	AHL1100AUT3B	
Athlon SFF 1200	1200 MHz	256 KB	200 MT/s	12x	1.55 V	35.0 W	?	AHL1200AHT3B AHL1200DHT3B	
Athlon SFF 1500+	1300 MHz	256 KB	200 MT/s	13x	1.50 V	35.0 W	?	AXL1500DLT3B	
Athlon SFF 1600+	1400 MHz	256 KB	200 MT/s	14x	1.45 V	35.0 W	?	AXL1600DQT3B	

=== Athlon XP "Thoroughbred A/B" (Model 8, 130 nm) ===
- CPU-ID: 6-8-0 (A), 6-8-1 (B)
- All models support: MMX, SSE, Enhanced 3DNow!

Model number	Frequency	L2-Cache	FSB	Multiplier	Voltage	TDP (Core)	Release date	Part number	Release price
Standard power
Athlon XP 1600+	1400 MHz	256 KB	266 MT/s	10.5x	1.60 V	48.5 W (B)	?	AXDA1600DUT3C	
Athlon XP 1700+	1466 MHz	256 KB	266 MT/s	11x	1.50 V	49.5 W (A/B)	June 10, 2002	AXDA1700DLT3C	
Athlon XP 1700+	1466 MHz	256 KB	266 MT/s	11x	1.60 V	49.5 W (B)	?	AXDA1700DUT3C	
Athlon XP 1800+	1533 MHz	256 KB	266 MT/s	11.5x	1.50 V	51.0 W (A/B)	June 10, 2002	AXDA1800DLT3C	
Athlon XP 1800+	1533 MHz	256 KB	266 MT/s	11.5x	1.60 V	51.0 W (B)	?	AXDA1800DUT3C	
Athlon XP 1900+	1600 MHz	256 KB	266 MT/s	12x	1.60 V	52.5 W (B)	?	AXDA1900DUT3C	
Athlon XP 2000+	1667 MHz	256 KB	266 MT/s	12.5x	1.60 V	60.3 W (A/B)	?	AXDA2000DUT3C	
Athlon XP 2000+	1667 MHz	256 KB	266 MT/s	12.5x	1.65 V	60.3 W (A)	June 10, 2002	AXDA2000DKT3C, AXDA2000DKV3C	
Athlon XP 2100+	1733 MHz	256 KB	266 MT/s	13x	1.60 V / 1.65 V	62.1 W (A/B)	?	AXDA2100DUT3C, AXDA2100DKV3C	
Athlon XP 2200+	1800 MHz	256 KB	266 MT/s	13.5x	1.65 V	67.9 W (A)	June 10, 2002	AXDA2200DKV3C	$241
Athlon XP 2200+	1800 MHz	256 KB	266 MT/s	13.5x	1.60 V	62.8 W (B)	?	AXDA2200DUV3C	
Athlon XP 2400+	2000 MHz	256 KB	266 MT/s	15x	1.60 V	65.3 W (B)		AXDA2400DUV3C	
Athlon XP 2400+	2000 MHz	256 KB	266 MT/s	15x	1.65 V	68.3 W (B)	August 21, 2002	AXDA2400DKV3C	$193
Athlon XP 2600+	2133 MHz	256 KB	266 MT/s	16x	1.65 V	68.3 W (B)	August 21, 2002	AXDA2600DKV3C	$297
Athlon XP 2600+	2083 MHz	256 KB	333 MT/s	12.5x	1.65 V	69.3 W (B)		AXDA2600DKV3D	
Athlon XP 2700+	2167 MHz	256 KB	333 MT/s	13x	1.65 V	68.3 W (B)	October 1, 2002	AXDA2700DKV3D	$349
Athlon XP 2800+	2250 MHz	256 KB	333 MT/s	13.5x	1.65 V	74.3 W (B)	October 1, 2002	AXDA2800DKV3D	$397
Athlon XP 3100+	2200 MHz	256 KB	400 MT/s	11x	1.65 V	? (B)	?	AXDC3100DKV3E	
Low voltage
Athlon XP SFF 1500+	1333 MHz	256 KB	266 MT/s	10x	1.45 V	35.0 W	?	AXLD1500DQT3C	
Athlon XP SFF 1600+	1400 MHz	256 KB	266 MT/s	10.5x	1.45 V	35.0 W	?	AXLD1600DQT3C	
Athlon XP SFF 1700+	1466 MHz	256 KB	266 MT/s	10.5x	1.45 V	35.0 W	?	AXLD1700DQT3C	
Athlon XP SFF 1800+	1533 MHz	256 KB	266 MT/s	11.5x	1.40 V	35.0 W	?	AXLD1800DVT3C	
Low-power Athlon XP 2200+	1800 MHz	256 KB	266 MT/s	13.5x	1.60 V	?	?	AXDL2200DUV3C	
Low-power Athlon XP 2400+	2000 MHz	256 KB	266 MT/s	15x	1.60 V	?	?	AXDL2400DUV3C	

=== Athlon XP "Thorton" (Model 10, 130 nm) ===
- CPU-ID: 6-A-0
- All models support: MMX, SSE, Enhanced 3DNow!

Model number	Frequency	L2-Cache	FSB	Multiplier	Voltage	TDP	Release date	Part number
Standard power
Athlon XP 2000+	1667 MHz	256 KB	266 MT/s	12.5x	1.50 V	60.3 W	September 2003	AXDC2000DLT3C
Athlon XP 2000+	1667 MHz	256 KB	266 MT/s	12.5x	1.60 V	60.3 W	September 2003	AXDC2000DUT3C
Athlon XP 2200+	1800 MHz	256 KB	266 MT/s	13.5x	1.50 V	62.8 W	September 2003	AXDC2200DLV3C
Athlon XP 2200+	1800 MHz	256 KB	266 MT/s	13.5x	1.60 V	62.8 W	September 2003	AXDC2200DUV3C
Athlon XP 2400+	2000 MHz	256 KB	266 MT/s	15x	1.65 V	68.3 W	September 2003	AXDC2400DKV3C
Athlon XP 2600+	2133 MHz	256 KB	266 MT/s	16x	1.65 V	68.3 W	September 2003	AXDC2600DKV3C
Athlon XP 2600+	2083 MHz	256 KB	333 MT/s	12.5x	1.65 V	68.3 W	September 2003	AXDC2600DKV3D
Athlon XP 3100+	2200 MHz	256 KB	400 MT/s	11.0x	1.65 V	68.3 W	December 2003	AXDC3100DKV3E

=== Athlon XP "Barton" (Model 10, 130 nm) ===
- CPU-ID: 6-A-0
- All models support: MMX, Extended MMX, SSE, 3DNow!, Enhanced 3DNow!

Model number	Frequency	L2-Cache	FSB	Multiplier	Voltage	TDP	Release date	Part number
Standard power
Athlon XP 2500+	1833 MHz	512 KB	333 MT/s	11x	1.65 V	68.3 W	February 10, 2003	AXDA2500DKV4D
Athlon XP 2500+	1867 MHz	512 KB	266 MT/s	14x	1.65 V	68.3 W	December 2004	AXDA2500DKV4C
Athlon XP 2500+	1800 MHz	512 KB	400 MT/s	9x	1.65 V	68.3 W	?	AXDA2500DKV4E
Athlon XP 2600+	1917 MHz	512 KB	333 MT/s	11.5x	1.65 V	68.3 W	September 21, 2003	AXDA2600DKV4D
Athlon XP 2600+	2000 MHz	512 KB	266 MT/s	15x	1.65 V	68.3 W	December 2004	AXDA2600DKV4C
Athlon XP 2600+	1900 MHz	512 KB	400 MT/s	9.5x	1.65 V	68.3 W	?	AXDA2600DKV4E
Athlon XP 2800+	2083 MHz	512 KB	333 MT/s	12.5x	1.65 V	68.3 W	February 10, 2003	AXDA2800DKV4D
Athlon XP 2800+	2133 MHz	512 KB	266 MT/s	16x	1.65 V	68.3 W	December 2004	AXDA2800DKV4C
Athlon XP 2900+	2000 MHz	512 KB	400 MT/s	10.0x	1.65 V	68.3 W	December 2004	AXDA2900DKV4E
Athlon XP 3000+	2100 MHz	512 KB	400 MT/s	10.5x	1.65 V	68.3 W	May 13, 2003	AXDA3000DKV4E
Athlon XP 3000+	2167 MHz	512 KB	333 MT/s	13x	1.65 V	74.3 W	February 10, 2003	AXDA3000DKV4D
Athlon XP 3200+	2200 MHz	512 KB	400 MT/s	11x	1.65 V	76.8 W	May 13, 2003	AXDA3200DKV4E
Athlon XP 3200+	2333 MHz	512 KB	333 MT/s	14x	1.65 V	79.2 W	October 2003	AXDA3200DKV4D
Low voltage
Low-power Athlon XP 2500+	1833 MHz	512 KB	333 MT/s	11x	1.50 V	?	?	AXDL2500DLV4D
Low-power Athlon XP 2600+	1917 MHz	512 KB	333 MT/s	11.5x	1.50 V	?	?	AXDL2600DLV4D
Low-power Athlon XP 2800+	2083 MHz	512 KB	333 MT/s	12.5x	1.65 V	?	?	AXDL2800DKV4D
Low-power Athlon XP 2800+	2083 MHz	512 KB	333 MT/s	12.5x	1.50 V	?	?	AXDL2800DLV4D
Low-power Athlon XP 3000+	2100 MHz	512 KB	400 MT/s	10.5x	1.50 V	?	?	AXDL3000DLV4E

== Server CPU ==
=== Athlon MP "Palomino" (Model 6, 180 nm) ===
- All models support: MMX, SSE, Enhanced 3DNow!

Model number	Frequency	L2-Cache	FSB	Multiplier	Voltage	TDP	Release date	Part number
Standard power
Athlon MP 1000	1000 MHz	256 KB	266 MT/s	7.5x	1.75 V	46.1 W	June 5, 2001	AHX1000AMS3C
Athlon MP 1200	1200 MHz	256 KB	200 MT/s	12x	1.80 V	?	?	AHX1200ANS3B
Athlon MP 1200	1200 MHz	256 KB	266 MT/s	9x	1.75 V	54.7 W	June 5, 2001	AHX1200AMS3C
Athlon MP 1500+	1333 MHz	256 KB	266 MT/s	10x	1.75 V	60.0 W	October 15, 2001	AMP1500DMS3C
Athlon MP 1600+	1400 MHz	256 KB	266 MT/s	10.5x	1.75 V	62.8 W	October 15, 2001	AMP1600DMS3C
Athlon MP 1800+	1533 MHz	256 KB	266 MT/s	11.5x	1.75 V	66.0 W	October 15, 2001	AMP1800DMS3C
Athlon MP 1900+	1600 MHz	256 KB	266 MT/s	12x	1.75 V	66.0 W	December 12, 2001	AMP1900DMS3C
Athlon MP 2000+	1667 MHz	256 KB	266 MT/s	12.5x	1.75 V	66.0 W	March 13, 2002	AMP2000DMS3C
Athlon MP 2100+	1733 MHz	256 KB	266 MT/s	13x	1.75 V	66.0 W	June 19, 2002	AMP2100DMS3C
Low voltage
Athlon MP 1200	1200 MHz	256 KB	266 MT/s	9x	1.55 V	?	?	AHX1200DHS3C

=== Athlon MP "Thoroughbred" (Model 8, 130 nm) ===
Model number	Frequency	L2-Cache	FSB	Multiplier	Voltage	TDP	Release date	Part number
Standard power
Athlon MP 2000+	1667 MHz	256 KB	266 MT/s	12.5x	1.60 V	60.0 W	August 27, 2002	AMSN2000DUT3C
Athlon MP 2000+	1667 MHz	256 KB	266 MT/s	12.5x	1.65 V	60.0 W	August 27, 2002	AMSN2000DKT3C
Athlon MP 2200+	1800 MHz	256 KB	266 MT/s	13.5x	1.65 V	60.0 W	August 27, 2002	AMSN2200DKT3C
Athlon MP 2400+	2000 MHz	256 KB	266 MT/s	15x	1.65 V	60.0 W	December 10, 2002	AMSN2400DKT3C
Athlon MP 2600+	2133 MHz	256 KB	266 MT/s	16x	1.65 V	60.0 W	February 4, 2003	AMSN2600DKT3C

=== Athlon MP "Barton" (Model 10, 130 nm) ===
- All models support: MMX, SSE, Enhanced 3DNow!

Model number	Frequency	L2-Cache	FSB	Multiplier	Voltage	TDP	Release date	Part number
Standard power
Athlon MP 2600+	2000 MHz	512 KB	266 MT/s	15x	1.60 V	60.0 W		AMSN2600DUT4C
Athlon MP 2800+	2133 MHz	512 KB	266 MT/s	16x	1.60 V	60.0 W	May 6, 2003	AMSN2800DUT4C

== Mobile Processors ==
=== Mobile Athlon 4 "Corvette" (Socket A) ===
- All models support: MMX, SSE, Enhanced 3DNow!, PowerNow!

Model number	Frequency	L2 Cache	FSB	Multiplier	Voltage	TDP	Release date	Part number
Standard power
Mobile Athlon 4 850	850 MHz	256 KB	200 MT/s	8.5x	1.20-1.40 V	22 W	May 14, 2001	AHM0850AVS3B
Mobile Athlon 4 900	900 MHz	256 KB	200 MT/s	9x	1.20-1.40 V	24 W	May 14, 2001	AHM0900AVS3B
Mobile Athlon 4 950	950 MHz	256 KB	200 MT/s	9.5x	1.20-1.40 V	24 W	May 14, 2001	AHM0950AVS3B
Mobile Athlon 4 1000	1000 MHz	256 KB	200 MT/s	10x	1.20-1.40 V	25 W	May 14, 2001	AHM1000AVS3B
Mobile Athlon 4 1100	1100 MHz	256 KB	200 MT/s	11x	1.20-1.40 V	25 W	August 20, 2001	AHM1100AVS3B
Desktop replacement
Mobile Athlon 4 1000	1000 MHz	256 KB	200 MT/s	10x	1.60 V	35 W	May 14, 2001	AHM1000AUQ3B
Mobile Athlon 4 1100	1100 MHz	256 KB	200 MT/s	11x	1.60 V	35 W	August 20, 2001	AHM1100AUQ3B
Mobile Athlon 4 1200	1200 MHz	256 KB	200 MT/s	12x	1.20-1.35 V	35 W	November 12, 2001	AHM1200AHQ3B
Mobile Athlon 4 1500+	1300 MHz	256 KB	200 MT/s	13x	1.40 V	35 W	January 28, 2002	AHM1500ALQ3B
Mobile Athlon 4 1600+	1400 MHz	256 KB	200 MT/s	14x	1.40 V	35 W	March 13, 2002	AHM1600AQQ3B

=== Mobile Athlon XP "Thoroughbred" (Socket A) ===
- All models support: MMX, SSE, Enhanced 3DNow!, PowerNow!

Model number	Frequency	L2 Cache	FSB	Multiplier	Voltage	TDP	Release date	Part number
Standard power
Mobile Athlon XP 1400+	1200 MHz	256 KB	200 MT/s	12x	1.45 V	35 W		AXMD1400FQQ3B
Mobile Athlon XP 1400+	1200 MHz	256 KB	266 MT/s	9x	1.45 V	35 W		AXMD1400FQQ3C
Mobile Athlon XP 1500+	1300 MHz	256 KB	200 MT/s	13x	1.45 V	35 W		AXMD1500FQQ3B
Mobile Athlon XP 1500+	1333 MHz	256 KB	266 MT/s	10x	1.45 V	35 W		AXMD1500FQQ3C
Mobile Athlon XP 1600+	1400 MHz	256 KB	200 MT/s	14x	1.45 V	35 W		AXMD1600FQQ3B
Mobile Athlon XP 1600+	1400 MHz	256 KB	200 MT/s	14x	1.40 V	35 W		AXMD1600FVQ3B
Mobile Athlon XP 1600+	1400 MHz	256 KB	266 MT/s	10.5x	1.45 V	35 W		AXMD1600FQQ3C
Mobile Athlon XP 1700+	1467 MHz	256 KB	266 MT/s	11x	1.45 V	35 W		AXMD1700FQQ3C
Mobile Athlon XP 1800+	1500 MHz	256 KB	200 MT/s	15x	1.45 V	35 W		AXMD1800FQQ3B
Mobile Athlon XP 1800+	1533 MHz	256 KB	266 MT/s	11.5x	1.40 V	35 W		AXMD1800FVQ3C
Mobile Athlon XP 1900+	1600 MHz	256 KB	200 MT/s	16x	1.40 V	35 W		AXMD1900FVQ3B
Mobile Athlon XP 1900+	1600 MHz	256 KB	266 MT/s	12x	1.40 V	35 W		AXMD1900FVQ3C
Balanced
Mobile Athlon XP 1400+	1200 MHz	256 KB	200 MT/s	12x	1.30 V	25 W		AXMD1400FWS3B
Mobile Athlon XP 1500+	1300 MHz	256 KB	200 MT/s	13x	1.30 V	25 W		AXMD1500FWS3B
Mobile Athlon XP 1500+	1333 MHz	256 KB	266 MT/s	10x	1.30 V	25 W		AXMD1500FWS3C
Mobile Athlon XP 1600+	1400 MHz	256 KB	200 MT/s	14x	1.30 V	25 W		AXMD1600FWS3B
Mobile Athlon XP 1600+	1400 MHz	256 KB	200 MT/s	14x	1.25 V	25 W		AXMD1600FXS3B
Mobile Athlon XP 1600+	1400 MHz	256 KB	266 MT/s	10.5x	1.25 V	25 W		AXMD1600FXS3C
Mobile Athlon XP 1700+	1467 MHz	256 KB	266 MT/s	11x	1.25 V	25 W		AXMD1700FXS3C
Mobile Athlon XP 1800+	1500 MHz	256 KB	200 MT/s	15x	1.25 V	25 W		AXMD1800FXS3B
Mobile Athlon XP 1800+	1533 MHz	256 KB	266 MT/s	11.5x	1.25 V	25 W		AXMD1800FXS3C

=== Athlon XP-M "Thoroughbred" (Socket A) ===
- All models support: MMX, SSE, Enhanced 3DNow!, PowerNow!

Model number	Frequency	L2 Cache	FSB	Multiplier	Voltage	TDP	Release date	Part number
Mainstream
Athlon XP-M 1600+	1400 MHz	256 KB	266 MT/s	10.5x	1.55 V	45 W	June 10, 2002	AXMH1600FHQ3C
Athlon XP-M 1700+	1467 MHz	256 KB	266 MT/s	11x	1.55 V	45 W	June 10, 2002	AXMH1700FHQ3C
Athlon XP-M 1800+	1533 MHz	256 KB	266 MT/s	11.5x	1.55 V	45 W	July 15, 2002	AXMH1800FHQ3C
Athlon XP-M 1800+	1533 MHz	256 KB	266 MT/s	11.5x	1.45 V	45 W		AXMH1800FQQ3C
Athlon XP-M 1900+	1600 MHz	256 KB	266 MT/s	12x	1.50 V	45 W	September 24, 2002	AXMH1900FLQ3C
Athlon XP-M 2000+	1667 MHz	256 KB	266 MT/s	12.5x	1.50 V	45 W	September 24, 2002	AXMH2000FLQ3C
Athlon XP-M 2000+	1667 MHz	256 KB	266 MT/s	12.5x	1.45 V	45 W		AXMH2000FQQ3C
Athlon XP-M 2200+	1800 MHz	256 KB	266 MT/s	13.5x	1.45 V	45 W	November 11, 2002	AXMH2200FQQ3C
Desktop replacement
Athlon XP-M 2000+	1667 MHz	256 KB	266 MT/s	12.5x	1.60 V	72 W	March 12, 2003	AXMA2000FUT3C
Athlon XP-M 2200+	1800 MHz	256 KB	266 MT/s	13.5x	1.60 V	72 W	March 12, 2003	AXMA2200FUT3C
Athlon XP-M 2400+	2000 MHz	256 KB	266 MT/s	15x	1.65 V	72 W	March 12, 2003	AXMA2400FKT3C
Athlon XP-M 2600+	2133 MHz	256 KB	266 MT/s	16x	1.65 V	72 W	March 12, 2003	AXMA2600FKT3C
Low voltage
Athlon XP-M 1500+	1300 MHz	256 KB	200 MT/s	13x	1.5 V	35 W		AXMD1500DLQ3B
Athlon XP-M 1600+	1400 MHz	256 KB	266 MT/s	10.5x	1.35 V	35 W	March 12, 2003	AXMD1600FJQ3C
Athlon XP-M 1700+	1467 MHz	256 KB	266 MT/s	11x	1.35 V	35 W	March 12, 2003	AXMD1700FJQ3C
Athlon XP-M 1800+	1533 MHz	256 KB	266 MT/s	11.5x	1.35 V	35 W	March 12, 2003	AXMD1800FJQ3C
Athlon XP-M 1900+	1600 MHz	256 KB	200 MT/s	16x	1.35 V	35 W	June 17, 2003	AXMD1900FJQ3B
Athlon XP-M 1900+	1600 MHz	256 KB	266 MT/s	12x	1.35 V	35 W	June 17, 2003	AXMD1900FJQ3C
Athlon XP-M 2000+	1667 MHz	256 KB	266 MT/s	12.5x	1.35 V	35 W	June 17, 2003	AXMD2000FJQ3C
Athlon XP-M 2200+	1800 MHz	256 KB	266 MT/s	13.5x	1.35 V	35 W		AXMD2200FJQ3C

=== Athlon XP-M "Thoroughbred" (Socket 563) ===
- All models support: MMX, SSE, Enhanced 3DNow!, PowerNow!

Model number	Frequency	L2 Cache	FSB	Multiplier	Voltage	TDP	Release date	Part number
Low voltage
Athlon XP-M 950	950 MHz	256 KB	200 MT/s	9.5x	1.2V	16 W		AXML0950GTS3B
Athlon XP-M 1000	1000 MHz	256 KB	200 MT/s	10x	1.2V	16 W		AXML1000GTS3B
Athlon XP-M 1200+	1000 MHz	256 KB	200 MT/s	10x	1.2V	16 W		AXML1200GTS3B
Athlon XP-M 1700+	1467 MHz	256 KB	266 MT/s	11x	1.25V	25 W		AXMS1700GXS3C
Athlon XP-M 1800+	1533 MHz	256 KB	266 MT/s	11.5x	1.25V	25 W		AXMS1800GXS3C
Athlon XP-M 1800+	1533 MHz	256 KB	266 MT/s	11.5x	1.35V	35 W		AXMD1800GJQ3C
Athlon XP-M 1900+	1600 MHz	256 KB	266 MT/s	12x	1.35V	35 W		AXMD1900GJQ3C
Athlon XP-M 2000+	1667 MHz	256 KB	266 MT/s	12.5x	1.35V	35 W		AXMD2000GJQ3C

=== Athlon XP-M "Barton" (Socket A) ===
- All models support: MMX, SSE, Enhanced 3DNow!, PowerNow!

Model number	Frequency	L2 Cache	FSB	Multiplier	Voltage	TDP	Release date	Part number
Mainstream
Athlon XP-M 2200+	1667 MHz	512 KB	266 MT/s	12.5x	1.45 V	45-53 W		AXMH2200FQQ4C
Athlon XP-M 2400+	1800 MHz	512 KB	266 MT/s	13.5x	1.45 V	45-53 W		AXMH2400FQQ4C
Athlon XP-M 2500+	1867 MHz	512 KB	266 MT/s	14x	1.45 V	45-53 W		AXMH2500FQQ4C
Athlon XP-M 2600+	2000 MHz	512 KB	266 MT/s	15x	1.45 V	45-53 W		AXMG2600FQQ4C
Athlon XP-M 2800+	2133 MHz	512 KB	266 MT/s	16x	1.55 V	45-53 W		AXMJ2800FHQ4C
Desktop replacement
Athlon XP-M 2400+	1800 MHz	512 KB	266 MT/s	13.5x	1.60 V	72 W		AXMA2400FUT4C
Athlon XP-M 2500+	1867 MHz	512 KB	266 MT/s	14x	1.65 V	72 W	2003	AXMA2500FKT4C
Athlon XP-M 2600+	2000 MHz	512 KB	266 MT/s	15x	1.65 V	72 W		AXMA2600FKT4C
Athlon XP-M 2800+	2133 MHz	512 KB	266 MT/s	16x	1.65 V	72 W	June 7, 2003	AXMA2800FKT4C
Athlon XP-M 3000+	2200 MHz	512 KB	266 MT/s	16.5x	1.65 V	72 W	2003	AXMA3000FKT4C
Low voltage
Athlon XP-M 2200+	1667 MHz	512 KB	266 MT/s	12.5x	1.35 V	35 W	July 13, 2004	AXMD2200FJQ4C
Athlon XP-M 2400+	1800 MHz	512 KB	266 MT/s	13.5x	1.35 V	35 W		AXMD2400FJQ4C
Athlon XP-M 2500+	1867 MHz	512 KB	266 MT/s	14x	1.4 V	35 W		AXMF2500FVQ4C

=== Athlon XP-M "Barton" (Socket 563) ===
- All models support: MMX, SSE, Enhanced 3DNow!, PowerNow!

Model number	Frequency	L2 Cache	FSB	Multiplier	Voltage	TDP	Release date	Part number
Low voltage
Athlon XP-M 1800+	1400 MHz	512 KB	266 MT/s	10.5x	1.35V	35 W		AXMD1800GJQ4C
Athlon XP-M 1900+	1467 MHz	512 KB	266 MT/s	11x	1.25V	25 W	June 17, 2003	AXMS1900GXS4C
Athlon XP-M 2000+	1533 MHz	512 KB	266 MT/s	11.5x	1.35V	35 W		AXMD2000GJQ4C
Athlon XP-M 2000+	1533 MHz	512 KB	266 MT/s	11.5x	1.25V	25 W	June 17, 2003	AXMS2000GXS4C
Athlon XP-M 2100+	1600 MHz	512 KB	200 MT/s	16x	1.25V	25 W	March 17, 2004	AXMS2100GXS4B
Athlon XP-M 2100+	1600 MHz	512 KB	266 MT/s	12x	1.25V	25 W	March 17, 2004	AXMS2100GXS4C
Athlon XP-M 2200+	1667 MHz	512 KB	266 MT/s	12.5x	1.35V	35 W		AXMD2200GJQ4C
Athlon XP-M 2200+	1667 MHz	512 KB	266 MT/s	12.5x	1.3V	27 W		AXMT2200GWS4C
Athlon XP-M 2400+	1800 MHz	512 KB	266 MT/s	13.5x	1.35V	35 W		AXMD2400GJQ4C
Athlon XP-M 2600+	1833 MHz	512 KB	333 MT/s	11x	1.35V	35 W		AXMD2600GJQ4D

=== Athlon XP-M "Dublin" (K8-based, Socket 754) ===
- All models support: MMX, SSE, SSE2, Enhanced 3DNow!, NX bit, EVP (Enhanced Virus Protection), PowerNow!
- Actually renamed AMD Mobile Sempron processors (SMN2600BIX2AY, SMN2800BIX3AY, SMN3000BIX2AY)

Model number	Frequency	L2 Cache	HyperTransport	Multiplier	Voltage	TDP	Release date	Part number(s)
Desktop replacement
Athlon XP-M 2800+	1600 MHz	128 KB	800 MHz	8x	0.95 ~ 1.40V	13-62 W		AHN2800BIX2AY; AHN2800BIX2AX; AHN2800BIX2AR; AHN2800BIX2AP
Athlon XP-M 3000+	1600 MHz	256 KB	800 MHz	8x	0.95 ~ 1.40V	13-62 W		AHN3000BIX3AX; AHN3000BIX3AP; AHN3000BIX3AY
Athlon XP-M 3100+	1800 MHz	256 KB	800 MHz	9x	0.95 ~ 1.40V	13-62 W		AHN3100BIX3X; AHN3100BIX3Y

== See also ==
- List of AMD Athlon microprocessors
- List of AMD Athlon 64 microprocessors
- List of AMD Athlon II microprocessors
- List of AMD Athlon X2 microprocessors
