= Socket 563 =

CPU socket for laptop AMD CPUs

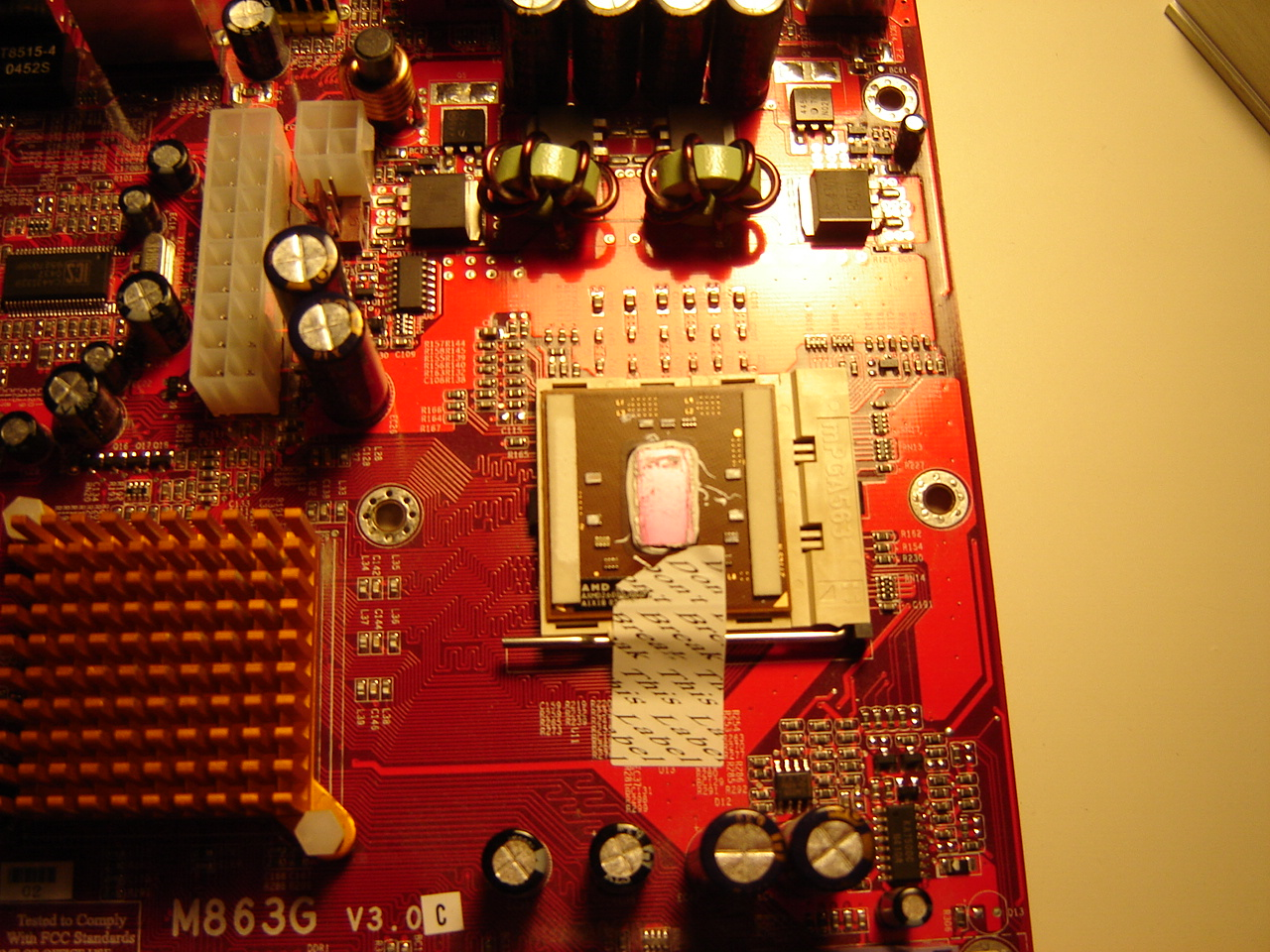
- Type: PGA-ZIF
- Chip form factors: PGA
- Contacts: 563
- Voltage range: 1.30 - 1.35 V
- Processors: AMD Athlon XP-M (950–3000+)
- Successor: Socket S1
- This article is part of the CPU socket series

Socket 563 is a microPGA CPU socket used for low-power (16 W and 25 W TDP) Athlon XP-M processors ("Thoroughbred" & "Barton"; Models 8 & 10). Socket 563 was also reportedly used for the "Appaloosa" Duron processors, which were never officially released but did see some very limited circulation. This socket is usually found in laptops and requires a low-power mobile processor in a special 563-pin μPGA package which is different from the Socket A (462 pin) package used for other Athlon processors. Socket 563 supports 32-bit CPUs only.

Only a few desktop computer motherboards were manufactured that had Socket 563 sockets. Motherboards equipped with Socket 563 include the PCChips M863G Ver3 (actually manufactured by ECS) and the ECS K7SOM. Both motherboards came bundled with socket 563 processors as well as a heatsink.

Socket 563 was succeeded by Socket S1 in 2006.

== See also ==
- List of AMD microprocessors
- Athlon XP-M
- Duron
