= List of AMD Athlon 64 processors =

The Athlon 64 microprocessor from Advanced Micro Devices (AMD) is an eighth-generation central processing unit (CPU). Athlon 64 was targeted at the consumer market.

== Features overview ==
Some features for Athlon 64 processors include:

- Use of HyperTransport technology for I/O devices
- System Management Mode
- 64-bit compatibility
- Integrated Memory Controller
- Cool'n'Quiet Technology
- Single and Dual-Core Options
- Scalability

== Single-core desktop processors ==
The single-core desktop Athlon 64 processors used multiple core designs across two manufacturing process nodes (130 nm and 90 nm), with sockets ranging from Socket 754 to Socket AM2.

=== Athlon 64 ===
"Code name" (Steppings, Process)

==== "ClawHammer" (C0 & CG, 130 nm) ====
- All models support: MMX, SSE, SSE2, Enhanced 3DNow!, NX bit, AMD64, Cool'n'Quiet

Model number	Clock (GHz)	L2 cache (kB)	HT (MHz)	Multi (Note: Clock multiplier applies to 200 MHz HyperTransport base clock.)	VCore (Volts)	TDP (Watts)	Socket	Release date	Part number(s)	Release price (USD)
Athlon 64 2800+	1.8	512	800	9x	1.50	89	754		ADA2800AEP4AP (C0); ADA2800AEP4AR (CG)	$178
Athlon 64 3000+	2.0	512	800	10x	1.50	89	754	December 15, 2003	ADA3000AEP4AP (C0); ADA3000AEP4AR (CG)	$218
Athlon 64 3200+	2.0	1024	800	10x	1.50	89	754	September 23, 2003	ADA3200AEP5AP (C0); ADA3200AEP5AR (CG)	$417
Athlon 64 3200+	2.2	512	800	11x	1.50	89	754		ADA3200AEP4AP (C0); ADA3200AEP4AR (CG)	
Athlon 64 3400+	2.4	512	800	12x	1.50	89	754		ADA3400AEP4AP (C0) (Note: Processors with these markings are believed to be used only as an engineering sample.); ADA3400AEP4AR (CG)	
Athlon 64 3400+	2.2	1024	800	11x	1.50	89	754	January 6, 2004	ADA3400AEP5AP (C0); ADA3400AEP5AR (CG)	$417
Athlon 64 3500+	2.2	512	1000	11x	1.50	89	939	June 1, 2004	ADA3500DEP4AS (CG)	$500
Athlon 64 3600+	2.4	1024	800	12x	1.50	89	754	~2004	ADA3600AEP5AR (CG)	
Athlon 64 3700+	2.4	1024	800	12x	1.50	89	754	June 1, 2004	ADA3700AEP5AP (C0) (Note: Most likely a fake processor. Possibly a mislabeled mobile processor.); ADA3700AEP5AR (CG)	$710
Athlon 64 3800+	2.4	512	1000	12x	1.50	89	939	June 1, 2004	ADA3800DEP4AS (CG)	$720
Athlon 64 4000+	2.4	1024	1000	12x	1.50	89	939	October 19, 2004	ADA4000DEP5AS (CG)	$729

==== "Newcastle" (CG, 130 nm) ====
- All models support: MMX, SSE, SSE2, Enhanced 3DNow!, NX bit, AMD64, Cool'n'Quiet

Model number	Clock (GHz)	L2 cache (kB)	HT (MHz)	Multi	VCore (Volts)	TDP (Watts)	Socket	Release date	Part number(s)	Release price (USD)
Athlon 64 2800+	1.8	512	800	9x	1.50	89	754		ADA2800AEP4AX	$178
Athlon 64 3000+	2.0	512	800	10x	1.50	89	754	December 15, 2003	ADA3000AEP4AX	$218
Athlon 64 3000+	1.8	512	1000	9x	1.50	89	939		ADA3000DEP4AW	
Athlon 64 3200+	2.2	512	800	11x	1.50	89	754		ADA3200AEP4AX	$278
Athlon 64 3200+	2.0	512	1000	10x	1.50	89	939		ADA3200DEP4AW	
Athlon 64 3300+ (Note: Athlon 64 3300+ is available in Hewlett-Packard and IBM systems only, or as an OEM chip. The Socket 939 3400+ (both Newcastle and Venice versions) is an OEM-only chip and was never directly available from AMD. It shares all Socket 939 3500+ characteristics with the exception of the 800 MHz HyperTransport Link. The 1500+ is only used in the HP BladeSystem bc1500 blade PC.)	2.4	256	800	12x	1.50	89	754		ADA3300AEP3AX	
Athlon 64 3400+	2.4	512	800	12x	1.50	89	754		ADA3400AEP4AX	
Athlon 64 3400+	2.2	512	800	11x	1.50	89	939	early 2004	ADA3400DEP4AZ	
Athlon 64 3500+	2.2	512	1000	11x	1.50	89	939	June 1, 2004	ADA3500DEP4AW	$500
Athlon 64 3800+	2.4	512	1000	12x	1.50	89	939	June 1, 2004	ADA3800DEP4AW	$720

==== "Winchester" (D0, 90 nm) ====
- All models support: MMX, SSE, SSE2, Enhanced 3DNow!, NX bit, AMD64, Cool'n'Quiet

Model number	Clock (GHz)	L2 cache (kB)	HT (MHz)	Multi	VCore (Volts)	TDP (Watts)	Socket	Release date	Part number(s)	Release price (USD)
Athlon 64 3000+	1.8	512	1000	9x	1.40	67	939	October 14, 2004	ADA3000DIK4BI	$163
Athlon 64 3200+	2.0	512	1000	10x	1.40	67	939	October 14, 2004	ADA3200DIK4BI	$208
Athlon 64 3500+	2.2	512	1000	11x	1.40	67	939	October 14, 2004	ADA3500DIK4BI	$288

==== "Venice" (E3 & E6, 90 nm) ====
- All models support: MMX, SSE, SSE2, SSE3, Enhanced 3DNow!, NX bit, AMD64, Cool'n'Quiet

Model number	Clock (GHz)	L2 cache (kB)	HT (GHz)	Multi	VCore (Volts)	TDP (Watts)	Socket	Release date	Part number(s)	Release price (USD)
Athlon 64 1500+	1.0	512	800	5x	0.90	9	754	November 7, 2004	ADC1500B2X4BX (E6)	
Athlon 64 3000+	2.0	512	800	10x	1.35	51	754		ADA3000AKK4BX (E6)	
Athlon 64 3000+	2.0	512	800	10x	1.40	51	754		ADA3000AIK4BX (E6)	
Athlon 64 3000+	1.8	512	1000	9x	1.35–1.40	67	939	April 4, 2005	ADA3000DAA4BP (E3); ADA3000DAA4BW (E6)	$149
Athlon 64 3200+	2.2	512	800	11x	1.40	59	754		ADA3200AIO4BX (E6)	
Athlon 64 3200+	2.0	512	1000	10x	1.35–1.40	67	939	April 4, 2005	ADA3200DAA4BP (E3); ADA3200DAA4BW (E6)	$194
Athlon 64 3400+ (Note: These Venice-based Socket 754 Athlon 64s are reported to be very rare. The 3400+ version has been verified to exist. They do exist and have been available for OEMs for some time.)	2.4	512	800	12x	1.40	67	754		ADA3400AIK4BO (E3)	
Athlon 64 3400+	2.2	512	800	11x	1.35–1.40	67	939		ADA3400DAA4BZ (E3) ADA3400DAA4BY (E6)	
Athlon 64 3500+	2.2	512	1000	11x	1.35–1.40	67	939	April 4, 2005	ADA3500DAA4BP (E3); ADA3500DAA4BW (E6)	$272
Athlon 64 3800+	2.4	512	1000	12x	1.35–1.40	89	939	April 4, 2005	ADA3800DAA4BP (E3); ADA3800DAA4BW (E6)	$424

==== "Manchester" (E4, 90 nm) ====
- Athlon 64 X2 dual-core with one core disabled
- All models support: MMX, SSE, SSE2, SSE3, Enhanced 3DNow!, NX bit, AMD64, Cool'n'Quiet

Model number	Clock (GHz)	L2 cache (kB)	HT (GHz)	Multi	VCore (Volts)	TDP (Watts)	Socket	Release date	Part number(s)	Release price (USD)
Athlon 64 3200+	2.0	512	1000	10x	1.35	67	939	May 31, 2005	ADA3200DKA4CG	$194
Athlon 64 3500+	2.2	512	1000	11x	1.35	67	939	May 31, 2005	ADA3500DKA4CG	$272

==== "San Diego" (E4, 90 nm) ====
- All models support: MMX, SSE, SSE2, SSE3, Enhanced 3DNow!, NX bit, AMD64, Cool'n'Quiet

Model number	Clock (GHz)	L2 cache (kB)	HT (GHz)	Multi	VCore (Volts)	TDP (Watts)	Socket	Release date	Part number(s)	Release price (USD)
Athlon 64 3500+	2.2	512	1000	11x	1.35–1.40	67	939	May 4, 2005	ADA3500DAA4BN	$272
Athlon 64 3700+	2.2	1024	1000	11x	1.35–1.40	89	939	May 4, 2005	ADA3700DAA5BN	$329
Athlon 64 4000+	2.4	1024	1000	12x	1.35–1.40	89	939	May 4, 2005	ADA4000DAA5BN	$482

==== "Toledo" (E6, 90 nm) ====
- Athlon 64 X2 dual-core with one core disabled
- All models support: MMX, SSE, SSE2, SSE3, Enhanced 3DNow!, NX bit, AMD64, Cool'n'Quiet

Model number	Clock (GHz)	L2 cache (kB)	HT (GHz)	Multi	VCore (Volts)	TDP (Watts)	Socket	Release date	Part number(s)	Release price (USD)
Athlon 64 3700+	2.2	1024	1000	11x	1.35	89	939		ADA3700DKA5CF	$272
Athlon 64 4000+	2.4	1024	1000	12x	1.35	89	939		ADA4000DKA5CF	$375

==== "Orleans" (F2 & F3, 90 nm) ====
- All models support: MMX, SSE, SSE2, SSE3, Enhanced 3DNow!, NX bit, AMD64, Cool'n'Quiet, AMD-V

Model number	Clock (GHz)	L2 cache (kB)	HT (GHz)	Multi	VCore (Volts)	TDP (Watts)	Socket	Release date	Part number(s)	Release price (USD)
Standard power
Athlon 64 3000+	1.8	512	1000	9x	1.35–1.40	62	AM2	May 23, 2006	ADA3000IAA4CN (F2); ADA3000IAA4CW (F2)	
Athlon 64 3200+	2.0	512	1000	10x	1.35–1.40	62	AM2	May 23, 2006	ADA3200IAA4CN (F2); ADA3200IAA4CW (F2)	
Athlon 64 3500+	2.2	512	1000	11x	1.25–1.40	62	AM2	May 23, 2006	ADA3500IAA4CN (F2); ADA3500IAA4CW (F2)	$189
Athlon 64 3500+ (F3)	2.2	512	1000	11x	1.25–1.40	62	AM2	February 20, 2007	ADA3500IAA4DH (F3)	$88
Athlon 64 3800+	2.4	512	1000	12x	1.25–1.40	62	AM2	May 23, 2006	ADA3800IAA4CN (F2); ADA3800IAA4CW (F2)	$290
Athlon 64 3800+ (F3)	2.4	512	1000	12x	1.25–1.40	62	AM2	February 20, 2007	ADA3800IAA4DH (F3)	$93
Athlon 64 4000+ (F3)	2.6	512	1000	13x	1.25–1.40	62	AM2	February 20, 2007	ADA4000IAA4DH (F3)	$102
Energy-efficient
Athlon 64 LE-1600	2.2	1024	1000	11x	1.25–1.40	45	AM2	October 8, 2007	ADH1600IAA5DH (F3)	$47
Athlon 64 LE-1620	2.4	1024	1000	12x	1.25–1.40	45	AM2	October 8, 2007	ADH1620IAA5DH (F3)	$53
Athlon 64 LE-1640	2.6	1024	1000	13x	1.25–1.40	45	AM2	January 7, 2008	ADH1640IAA5DH (F3)	$53
Energy-efficient small form factor
Athlon 64 3500+	2.2	512	1000	11x	1.20–1.25	35	AM2	May 23, 2006	ADD3500IAA4CN (F2)	$231

==== "Lima" (G1 & G2, 65 nm) ====
- All models support: MMX, SSE, SSE2, SSE3, Enhanced 3DNow!, NX bit, AMD64, Cool'n'Quiet, AMD-V

Model number	Clock (GHz)	L2 cache (kB)	HT (GHz)	Multi	VCore (Volts)	TDP (Watts)	Socket	Release date	Part number(s)	Release price (USD)
Energy-efficient
Athlon 64 2650e (G2)	1.6	512	1000	8x	1.20–1.25	15	Socket AM2	Q4, 2008	ADG2650IAV4DP (G2)	
Athlon 64 2850e (G2)	1.8	512	1000	9x	1.20–1.25	22	Socket AM2	Q4, 2008	ADJ2850IAA4DP (G2)	
Athlon 64 3500+	2.2	512	1000	11x	1.20–1.25	45	Socket AM2	February 20, 2007	ADH3500IAA4DE (G1)	$88
Athlon 64 3800+	2.4	512	1000	12x	1.25–1.40	45	Socket AM2	February 20, 2007	ADH3800IAA4DE (G1)	$93
Athlon LE-1640B (G2) (Note: AMD Business Class processor, availability guaranteed for 24 months after release.)	2.7	512	1000	13.5x	1.25–1.40	45	Socket AM2	April 28, 2008	ADH164BIAA4DP (G2)	
Athlon LE-1640 (G2)	2.7	512	1000	13.5x	1.25–1.40	45	Socket AM2		ADH1640IAA4DP (G2)	
Athlon LE-1660 (G2)	2.8	512	1000	14x	1.25–1.40	45	Socket AM2	2008	ADH1660IAA4DP (G2)	
Embedded energy-efficient
Athlon 64 2000+	1.0	512	1000	5x	0.90	8	Socket AM2	??	ADF2000IAV4DRE (G2)	
Athlon 64 2600+	1.6	512	1000	8x	?	15	Socket AM2	??	ADG2600IAV4DRE (G2)	
Athlon 64 3100+	2.0	512	1000	10x	?	25	Socket AM2	??	ADS3100IAR4DRE (G2)	

=== Athlon 64 FX ===
==== "SledgeHammer" (C0 & CG, 130 nm) ====
- All models support: MMX, SSE, SSE2, Enhanced 3DNow!, NX bit, AMD64

Model number	Clock (GHz)	L2 cache (kB)	HT (GHz)	Multi	VCore (Volts)	TDP (Watts)	Socket	Release date	Part number(s)	Release price (USD)
Athlon 64 FX-51	2.2	1024	800	11x	1.50	89	940	September 23, 2003	ADAFX51CEP5AK (C0); ADAFX51CEP5AT (CG)	$733
Athlon 64 FX-53	2.4	1024	800	12x	1.50	89	940	March 18, 2004	ADAFX53CEP5AT (CG)	$733

==== "ClawHammer" (CG, 130 nm) ====
- All models support: MMX, SSE, SSE2, Enhanced 3DNow!, NX bit, AMD64, Cool'n'Quiet

Model number	Clock (GHz)	L2 cache (kB)	HT (GHz)	Multi	VCore (Volts)	TDP (Watts)	Socket	Release date	Part number(s)	Release price (USD)
Athlon 64 FX-53	2.4	1024	1000	12x	1.50	89	939	June 1, 2004	ADAFX53DEP5AS	$799
Athlon 64 FX-55	2.6	1024	1000	13x	1.50	104	939	October 19, 2004	ADAFX55DEI5AS	$827

==== "San Diego" (E4, 90 nm) ====
- All models support: MMX, SSE, SSE2, SSE3, Enhanced 3DNow!, NX bit, AMD64, Cool'n'Quiet

Model number	Clock (GHz)	L2 cache (kB)	HT (GHz)	Multi	VCore (Volts)	TDP (Watts)	Socket	Release date	Part number(s)	Release price (USD)
Athlon 64 FX-55	2.6	1024	1000	13x	1.35–1.40	104	939		ADAFX55DAA5BN	$827
Athlon 64 FX-57	2.8	1024	1000	14x	1.35–1.40	104	939	June 27, 2005	ADAFX57DAA5BN	$1,031

== Dual-core desktop processors ==
The Athlon 64 X2 was AMD's first dual-core desktop processor line, launched in 2005, providing two cores on a single die for improved multitasking performance.

=== Athlon 64 X2 ===
==== "Manchester" (E4, 90 nm) ====
- All models support: MMX, SSE, SSE2, SSE3, Enhanced 3DNow!, NX bit, AMD64, Cool'n'Quiet

Model number	Clock (GHz)	L2 cache (kB)	HT (GHz)	Multi	VCore (Volts)	TDP (Watts)	Socket	Release date	Part number(s)	Release price (USD)
Athlon 64 X2 3600+	2.0	2 × 256	1000	10x	1.30–1.35	89–110	939		ADA3600DAA4BV	
Athlon 64 X2 3800+	2.0	2 × 512	1000	10x	1.30–1.35	89	939	August 1, 2005	ADA3800DAA5BV	$354
Athlon 64 X2 4200+	2.2	2 × 512	1000	11x	1.30–1.35	89	939	May 31, 2005	ADA4200DAA5BV	$581
Athlon 64 X2 4600+	2.4	2 × 512	1000	12x	1.30–1.35	110	939	May 31, 2005	ADA4600DAA5BV	$803

==== "Toledo" (E6, 90 nm) ====
- All models support: MMX, SSE, SSE2, SSE3, Enhanced 3DNow!, NX bit, AMD64, Cool'n'Quiet

Model number	Clock (GHz)	L2 cache (kB)	HT (GHz)	Multi	VCore (Volts)	TDP (Watts)	Socket	Release date	Part number(s)	Release price (USD)
Athlon 64 X2 3800+	2.0	2 × 512	1000	10x	1.30–1.35	89	939	August 1, 2005	ADA3800DAA5CD	$354
Athlon 64 X2 4200+	2.2	2 × 512	1000	11x	1.30–1.35	89	939	May 31, 2005	ADA4200DAA5CD	$537
Athlon 64 X2 4400+	2.2	2 × 1024	1000	11x	1.30–1.35	110	939	May 31, 2005	ADA4400DAA6CD	$581
Athlon 64 X2 4400+	2.2	2 × 1024	1000	11x	1.30–1.35	89	939		ADV4400DAA6CD	
Athlon 64 X2 4600+	2.4	2 × 512	1000	12x	1.30–1.35	110	939	May 31, 2005	ADA4600DAA5CD	$803
Athlon 64 X2 4800+	2.4	2 × 1024	1000	12x	1.30–1.35	110	939	May 31, 2005	ADA4800DAA6CD	$1001

==== "Windsor" (F2 & F3, 90 nm) ====
- All models support: MMX, SSE, SSE2, SSE3, Enhanced 3DNow!, NX bit, AMD64, Cool'n'Quiet, AMD-V

Model number	Clock (GHz)	L2 cache (kB)	HT (GHz)	Multi	VCore (Volts)	TDP (Watts)	Socket	Release date	Part number(s)	Release price (USD)
Standard power
Athlon 64 X2 3800+	2.0	2 × 512	1000	10x	1.30–1.35	89	AM2	May 23, 2006	ADA3800IAA5CU (F2)	$303
Athlon 64 X2 4000+	2.0	2 × 1024	1000	10x	1.30–1.35	89	AM2	May 23, 2006	ADA4000IAA6CS (F2)	$328
Athlon 64 X2 4200+	2.2	2 × 512	1000	11x	1.30–1.35	89	AM2	May 23, 2006	ADA4200IAA5CU (F2)	$365
Athlon 64 X2 4400+	2.2	2 × 1024	1000	11x	1.30–1.35	89	AM2	May 23, 2006	ADA4400IAA6CS (F2)	$470
Athlon 64 X2 4600+	2.4	2 × 512	1000	12x	1.30–1.35	89	AM2	May 23, 2006	ADA4600IAA5CU (F2)	$558
Athlon 64 X2 4800+	2.4	2 × 1024	1000	12x	1.30–1.35	89	AM2	May 23, 2006	ADA4800IAA6CS (F2)	$645
Athlon 64 X2 5000+	2.6	2 × 512	1000	13x	1.30–1.35	89	AM2	May 23, 2006	ADA5000IAA5CS (F2); ADA5000IAA5CU (F2)	$696
Athlon 64 X2 5000+ (F3)	2.6	2 × 512	1000	13x	1.30–1.35	89	AM2		ADA5000IAA5CZ (F3)	
Athlon 64 X2 5200+	2.6	2 × 1024	1000	13x	1.30–1.35	89	AM2	September 6, 2006	ADA5200IAA6CS (F2)	$403
Athlon 64 X2 5200+ (F3)	2.6	2 × 1024	1000	13x	1.20–1.25	89	AM2		ADA5200IAA6CZ (F3)	
Athlon 64 X2 5400+ (F3)	2.8	2 × 512	1000	14x	1.30–1.35	89	AM2	December 12, 2006	ADA5400IAA5CZ (F3)	$485
Athlon 64 X2 5600+ (F3)	2.8	2 × 1024	1000	14x	1.30–1.35	89	AM2	December 12, 2006	ADA5600IAA6CZ (F3)	$505
Athlon 64 X2 6000+ (F3)	3.0	2 × 1024	1000	15x	1.35–1.40	125	AM2	February 20, 2007	ADX6000IAA6CZ (F3)	$464
Athlon 64 X2 6000+ (F3)	3.0	2 × 1024	1000	15x	1.30–1.35	89	AM2	August 20, 2007	ADA6000IAA6CZ (F3)	
Athlon 64 X2 6400+ (F3); Black Edition	3.2	2 × 1024	1000	16x	1.35–1.40	125	AM2	August 20, 2007	ADX6400IAA6CZ (F3)	$251
Energy-efficient
Athlon 64 X2 3600+	2.0	2 × 256	1000	10x	1.20–1.25	65	AM2	August 2006	ADO3600IAA4CU (F2)	
Athlon 64 X2 3800+	2.0	2 × 512	1000	10x	1.20–1.25	65	AM2	May 23, 2006	ADO3800IAA5CS (F2); ADO3800IAA5CU (F2)	$323
Athlon 64 X2 3800+ (F3)	2.0	2 × 512	1000	10x	1.20–1.25	65	AM2	February 20, 2007	ADO3800IAA5CZ (F3)	
Athlon 64 X2 4000+	2.0	2 × 1024	1000	10x	1.20–1.25	65	AM2	May 23, 2006	ADO4000IAA6CS (F2)	$353
Athlon 64 X2 4200+	2.2	2 × 512	1000	11x	1.20–1.25	65	AM2	May 23, 2006	ADO4200IAA5CU (F2)	$417
Athlon 64 X2 4400+	2.2	2 × 1024	1000	11x	1.20–1.25	65	AM2	May 23, 2006	ADO4400IAA6CS (F2)	$514
Athlon 64 X2 4600+	2.4	2 × 512	1000	12x	1.20–1.25	65	AM2	May 23, 2006	ADO4600IAA5CS (F2); ADO4600IAA5CU (F2)	$601
Athlon 64 X2 4600+ (F3)	2.4	2 × 512	1000	12x	1.20–1.25	65	AM2	February 20, 2007	ADO4600IAA5CZ (F3)	
Athlon 64 X2 4800+	2.4	2 × 1024	1000	12x	1.20–1.25	65	AM2	May 23, 2006	ADO4800IAA6CS (F2)	$671
Athlon 64 X2 5000+	2.6	2 × 512	1000	13x	1.20–1.25	65	AM2	October 30, 2006	ADO5000IAA5CS (F2)	$301
Athlon 64 X2 5000+ (F3)	2.6	2 × 512	1000	13x	1.20–1.25	65	AM2	February 20, 2007	ADO5000IAA5CZ (F3)	
Athlon 64 X2 5200+ (F3)	2.6	2 × 1024	1000	13x	1.20–1.25	65	AM2	February 20, 2007	ADO5200IAA6CZ (F3)	
Energy-efficient small form factor
Athlon 64 X2 3800+	2.0	2 × 512	1000	10x	1.025–1.075	35	AM2	May 23, 2006	ADD3800IAA5CU (F2); ADD3800IAA5CT (F2)	$364

==== "Brisbane" (G1 & G2, 65 nm) ====
- All models support: MMX, SSE, SSE2, SSE3, Enhanced 3DNow!, NX bit, AMD64, Cool'n'Quiet, AMD-V

Model number	Clock (GHz)	L2 cache (kB)	HT (GHz)	Multi	VCore (Volts)	TDP (Watts)	Socket	Release date	Part number(s)	Release price (USD)
Athlon 64 X2 3600+	1.9	2 × 512	1000	9.5x	1.25–1.35	65	AM2	January 22, 2007	ADO3600IAA5DD (G1); ADO3600IAA5DL (G1)	$138
Athlon 64 X2 4000+	2.1	2 × 512	1000	10.5x	1.25–1.35	65	AM2	December 5, 2006	ADO4000IAA5DD (G1)	$169
Athlon 64 X2 4200+	2.2	2 × 512	1000	11x	1.25–1.35	65	AM2	2007	ADO4200IAA5DD (G1)	
Athlon 64 X2 4200+	2.2	2 × 512	1000	11x	1.325–1.375	65	AM2		ADO4200IAA5DO (G2)	
Athlon 64 X2 4400+	2.3	2 × 512	1000	11.5x	1.25–1.35	65	AM2	December 5, 2006	ADO4400IAA5DD (G1)	$214
Athlon 64 X2 4400+	2.3	2 × 512	1000	11.5x	1.325–1.375	65	AM2	October 8, 2007	ADO4400IAA5DO (G2)	$89
Athlon 64 X2 4600+	2.4	2 × 512	1000	12x	1.325–1.375	65	AM2		ADO4600IAA5DO (G2)	
Athlon 64 X2 4800+	2.5	2 × 512	1000	12.5x	1.25–1.35	65	AM2	December 5, 2006	ADO4800IAA5DD (G1)	$271
Athlon 64 X2 4800+	2.5	2 × 512	1000	12.5x	1.325–1.375	65	AM2	October 8, 2007	ADO4800IAA5DO (G2)	$104
Athlon 64 X2 5000+	2.6	2 × 512	1000	13x	1.25–1.35	65	AM2	December 5, 2006	ADO5000IAA5DD (G1)	$301
Athlon 64 X2 5000+	2.6	2 × 512	1000	13x	1.325–1.375	65	AM2	October 8, 2007	ADO5000IAA5DO (G2)	$115
Athlon 64 X2 5000+ Black Edition	2.6	2 × 512	1000	13x	1.25–1.35	65	AM2	September 25, 2007	ADO5000IAA5DS (G2)	$136
Athlon 64 X2 5200+	2.7	2 × 512	1000	13.5x	1.25–1.35	65	AM2		ADO5200IAA5DD (G1)	
Athlon 64 X2 5200+	2.7	2 × 512	1000	13.5x	1.325–1.375	65	AM2	October 8, 2007	ADO5200IAA5DO (G2)	$125
Athlon 64 X2 5400+	2.8	2 × 512	1000	14x	1.325–1.375	65	AM2	January, 2008	ADO5400IAA5DO (G2)	
Athlon 64 X2 5400+ Black Edition	2.8	2 × 512	1000	14x	1.325–1.375	65	AM2	June, 2008	ADO5400IAA5DS (G2)	
Athlon 64 X2 5600+	2.9	2 × 512	1000	14.5x	1.325–1.375	65	AM2	February, 2008	ADO5600IAA5DO (G2)	
Athlon 64 X2 5800+	3.0	2 × 512	1000	15x	?	89	AM2	April, 2008	ADA5800IAA5DO (G2)	
Athlon 64 X2 6000+	3.1	2 × 512	1000	15.5x	1.1–1.40	89	AM2	June, 2008	ADV6000IAA5DO (G2)	

=== Athlon 64 FX ===
==== "Toledo" (E6, 90 nm) ====
- All models support: MMX, SSE, SSE2, SSE3, Enhanced 3DNow!, NX bit, AMD64, Cool'n'Quiet

Model number	Clock (GHz)	L2 cache (kB)	HT (GHz)	Multi	VCore (Volts)	TDP (Watts)	Socket	Release date	Part number(s)	Release price (USD)
Athlon 64 FX-60	2.6	2 × 1024	1000	13x	1.35–1.40	110	939	January 9, 2006	ADAFX60DAA6CD	$1,031

==== "Windsor" (F2, 90 nm) ====
- All models support: MMX, SSE, SSE2, SSE3, Enhanced 3DNow!, NX bit, AMD64, Cool'n'Quiet, AMD-V

Model number	Clock (GHz)	L2 cache (kB)	HT (GHz)	Multi	VCore (Volts)	TDP (Watts)	Socket	Release date	Part number(s)	Release price (USD)
Athlon 64 FX-62	2.8	2 × 1024	1000	14x	1.35–1.40	125	AM2	May 23, 2006	ADAFX62IAA6CS	$1,031

==== "Windsor" (Quad FX platform, F3, 90 nm) ====
- All models support: MMX, SSE, SSE2, SSE3, Enhanced 3DNow!, NX bit, AMD64, Cool'n'Quiet, AMD-V
- Usually sold in pairs

Model number	Clock (GHz)	L2 cache (kB)	HT (GHz)	Multi	VCore (Volts)	TDP (Watts)	Socket	Release date	Part number(s)	Release price (USD)
Athlon 64 FX-70	2.6	2 × 1024	1000	13x	1.35–1.40	125	F (1207 FX)	November 30, 2006	ADAFX70GAA6DI	$599/pair
Athlon 64 FX-72	2.8	2 × 1024	1000	14x	1.35–1.40	125	F (1207 FX)	November 30, 2006	ADAFX72GAA6DI	$799/pair
Athlon 64 FX-74	3.0	2 × 1024	1000	15x	1.35–1.40	125	F (1207 FX)	November 30, 2006	ADAFX74GAA6DI	$999/pair

== Mobile processors ==
The Mobile Athlon 64 line brought 64-bit computing to notebooks, with multiple power classes including desktop replacement, standard power, and low-power variants.

=== Mobile Athlon 64 ===
==== "ClawHammer" (C0 & CG, 130 nm) ====
- All models support: MMX, SSE, SSE2, Enhanced 3DNow!, NX bit, AMD64, PowerNow!

Model number	Clock (GHz)	L2 cache (kB)	HT (GHz)	Multi	VCore (Volts)	TDP (Watts)	Socket	Release date	Part number(s)	Release price (USD)
Desktop replacement
Mobile Athlon 64 2700+	1.6	512	800	8x	1.50	19–81.5	754		AMA2700BEY4AP (C0)	
Mobile Athlon 64 2800+	1.6	1024	800	8x	1.50	19–81.5	754		AMA2800BEX5AP (C0); AMA2800BEX5AR (CG)	
Mobile Athlon 64 3000+	1.8	1024	800	9x	1.50	19–81.5	754	September 23, 2003	AMA3000BEX5AP (C0); AMA3000BEX5AR (CG)	$278
Mobile Athlon 64 3200+	2.0	1024	800	10x	1.50	19–81.5	754	September 23, 2003	AMA3200BEX5AP (C0); AMA3200BEX5AR (CG)	$417
Mobile Athlon 64 3400+	2.2	1024	800	11x	1.50	19–81.5	754	January 6, 2004	AMA3400BEX5AP (C0); AMA3400BEX5AR (CG)	$417
Mobile Athlon 64 3700+	2.4	1024	800	12x	1.50	19–81.5	754	August 17, 2004	AMA3700BEX5AP (C0); AMA3700BEX5AR (CG)	$500
Standard power
Mobile Athlon 64 2800+	1.6	1024	800	8x	1.40	62	754	January 6, 2004	AMN2800BIX5AP (C0); AMN2800BIX5AR (CG)	$193
Mobile Athlon 64 3000+	1.8	1024	800	9x	1.40	62	754	January 6, 2004	AMN3000BIX5AP (C0); AMN3000BIX5AR (CG)	$233
Mobile Athlon 64 3200+	2.0	1024	800	10x	1.40	62	754	January 6, 2004	AMN3200BIX5AP (C0); AMN3200BIX5AR (CG)	$293
Mobile Athlon 64 3400+	2.2	1024	800	11x	1.40	62	754	July 19, 2004	AMN3400BIX5AR (CG)	$432
Low power
Mobile Athlon 64 2700+	1.6	512	800	8x	1.20	35	754	June 1, 2004	AMD2700BQX4AR (CG)	$209

==== "Odessa" (CG, 130 nm) ====
- All models support: MMX, SSE, SSE2, Enhanced 3DNow!, NX bit, AMD64, PowerNow!

Model number	Clock (GHz)	L2 cache (kB)	HT (GHz)	Multi	VCore (Volts)	TDP (Watts)	Socket	Release date	Part number(s)	Release price (USD)
Desktop replacement
Mobile Athlon 64 2800+	1.8	512	800	8x	1.50	19–81.5	754		AMA2800BEX4AX	
Low power
Mobile Athlon 64 2700+	1.6	512	800	8x	1.20	35	754	May 6, 2004	AMD2700BQX4AX	$209
Mobile Athlon 64 2800+	1.8	512	800	9x	1.20	35	754	May 6, 2004	AMD2800BQX4AX	$241
Mobile Athlon 64 3000+	2.0	512	800	10x	1.20	35	754		AMD3000BQX4AX	$241

==== "Oakville" (D0, 90 nm) ====
- All models support: MMX, SSE, SSE2, Enhanced 3DNow!, NX bit, AMD64, PowerNow!

Model number	Clock (GHz)	L2 cache (kB)	HT (GHz)	Multi	VCore (Volts)	TDP (Watts)	Socket	Release date	Part number(s)	Release price (USD)
Mobile Athlon 64 2700+	1.6	512	800	8x	1.35	35	754		AMD2700BKX4LB	$209
Mobile Athlon 64 2800+	1.8	512	800	9x	1.35	35	754		AMD2800BKX4LB	$241
Mobile Athlon 64 3000+	2.0	512	800	10x	1.35	35	754	August 17, 2004	AMD3000BKX4LB	$241

==== "Newark" (E5, 90 nm, 62W TDP) ====
- All models support: MMX, SSE, SSE2, SSE3, Enhanced 3DNow!, NX bit, AMD64, PowerNow!

Model number	Clock (GHz)	L2 cache (kB)	HT (GHz)	Multi	VCore (Volts)	TDP (Watts)	Socket	Release date	Part number(s)	Release price (USD)
Mobile Athlon 64 3000+	1.8	1024	800	9x	1.35	62	754	April 14, 2005	AMN3000BKX5BU	$153
Mobile Athlon 64 3200+	2.0	1024	800	10x	1.35	62	754	April 14, 2005	AMN3200BKX5BU	$198
Mobile Athlon 64 3400+	2.2	1024	800	11x	1.35	62	754	April 14, 2005	AMN3400BKX5BU	$228
Mobile Athlon 64 3700+	2.4	1024	800	12x	1.35	62	754	April 14, 2005	AMN3700BKX5BU	$336
Mobile Athlon 64 4000+	2.6	1024	800	13x	1.35	62	754	August 16, 2005	AMN4000BKX5BU	$382

=== Athlon Neo ===
==== "Huron" (65 nm, 15W TDP) ====
- All models support: MMX, SSE, SSE2, SSE3, Enhanced 3DNow!, NX bit, AMD64, PowerNow!, AMD-V

Model number	Clock (GHz)	L2 cache (kB)	HT (GHz)	Multi	VCore (Volts)	TDP (Watts)	Package	Release date	Part number(s)
Athlon Neo MV-40	1.6	512	800	8x	1.1	15	ASB1	January 9, 2009	AMGMV40OAX4DX (Tray)

==== "Sherman" (65 nm, 15W TDP) ====
- All models support: MMX, SSE, SSE2, SSE3, Enhanced 3DNow!, NX bit, AMD64, PowerNow!, AMD-V

Model number	Clock (GHz)	L2 cache (kB)	HT (GHz)	Multi	VCore (Volts)	TDP (Watts)	Package	Release date	Part number(s)
Athlon Neo TF-20	1.6	512	800	8x	1.0	15	S1	Q1 2009	AMGTF20HAX4DN

=== Athlon Neo X2 ===
==== "Conesus" (65 nm) ====
- All models support: MMX, SSE, SSE2, SSE3, Enhanced 3DNow!, NX bit, AMD64, AMD-V

Model number	Clock (GHz)	L2 cache (kB)	HT (GHz)	Multiplier	Voltage	TDP (Watts)	Socket	Release date	Part number(s)
Athlon Neo X2 L325	1.5	2 × 512	800	7.5x	0.925	18	ASB1	June 2009	AMZL325OAX5DY
Athlon Neo X2 L335	1.6	2 × 256	800	8x	0.925	18	ASB1	June 2009	AMZL335OAX5DY
Athlon Neo X2 L510	1.6	2 × 512	800	8x	0.925	18	ASB1	June 2009	AMZL510OAX5DY

== See also ==
- List of AMD microprocessors
