= Socket 754 =

CPU socket for old AMD CPUs

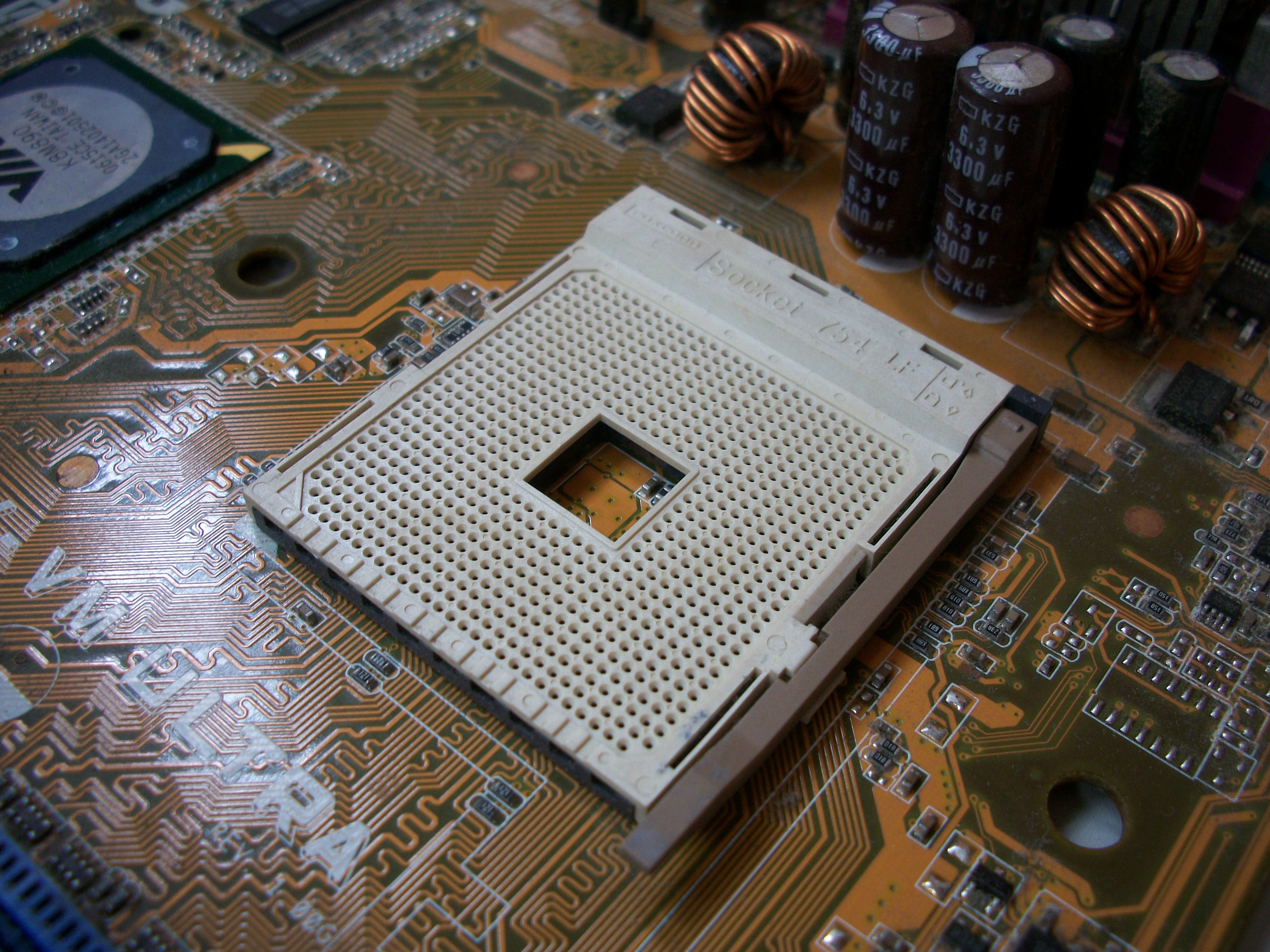
- Release date: 2003-06
- Type: PGA-ZIF
- Chip form factors: OPGA
- Contacts: 754
- FSB frequency: 200 MHz System clock 800 MHz HyperTransport
- Voltage range: 0.8 - 1.55 V
- Processor dimensions: 40 mm × 40 mm 1,600 mm²
- Processors: AMD Athlon 64 (2800+ - 3700+); AMD Sempron (2500+ - 3400+); AMD Turion 64 (ML and MT); AMD Mobile Athlon 64 (2800+ - 4000+)
- Predecessor: Socket A
- Successor: Socket 939 (desktops); Socket S1 (laptops)
- Memory support: DDR
- This article is part of the CPU socket series

Socket 754 is a CPU socket originally developed by AMD to supersede its Athlon XP platform (Socket A, also referred to as Socket 462). Socket 754 was one of the first sockets developed by AMD to support their new 64-bit microprocessor family known as AMD64, this time for the consumer market.

== Technical specifications ==
Socket 754 was the original socket for AMD's Athlon 64 desktop processors. Due to the introduction of newer socket layouts (i.e. Socket 939 and Socket AM2), Socket 754 became the more "budget-minded" socket for use with AMD Athlon 64 or Sempron processors. It differs from Socket 939 in several areas:

- support for a single channel memory controller (64 bits wide) with a maximum of three unbuffered DIMMs, or four registered DIMMs
- no dual-core CPU support
- lower HyperTransport speed (800 MHz Bi-Directional, 16 bit data path, up and downstream)
- lower effective data bandwidth (9.6 GB/s)
- lower motherboard manufacturing costs

Although AMD promoted Socket 754 as a budget platform on the desktop and encouraged mid- and high-end users to use newer platforms, Socket 754 remained for some time as AMD's high-end solution for mobile applications (e.g. the HP zv6000 series). However in 2006, Socket S1 was released and superseded Socket 754 in the mobile CPU segment, with support for dual-core CPUs and DDR2 SDRAM.

== Heatsink ==
The 2 holes for fastening the heatsink to the motherboard are placed at a distance of 90 mm.

== Availability ==
Demonstration of a PGA-ZIF socket (AMD 754).

The first processors using Socket 754 came on the market in the second half of 2003. Socket 754 was phased out in favor of Socket 939 on desktops because of low sales. The socket remained in use for laptops until it was replaced by Socket S1 in 2006.

== See also ==
- List of AMD microprocessors
- List of AMD Athlon 64 microprocessors
- List of AMD Sempron microprocessors
