= Socket A =

CPU socket for old AMD CPUs

Socket 462 / A
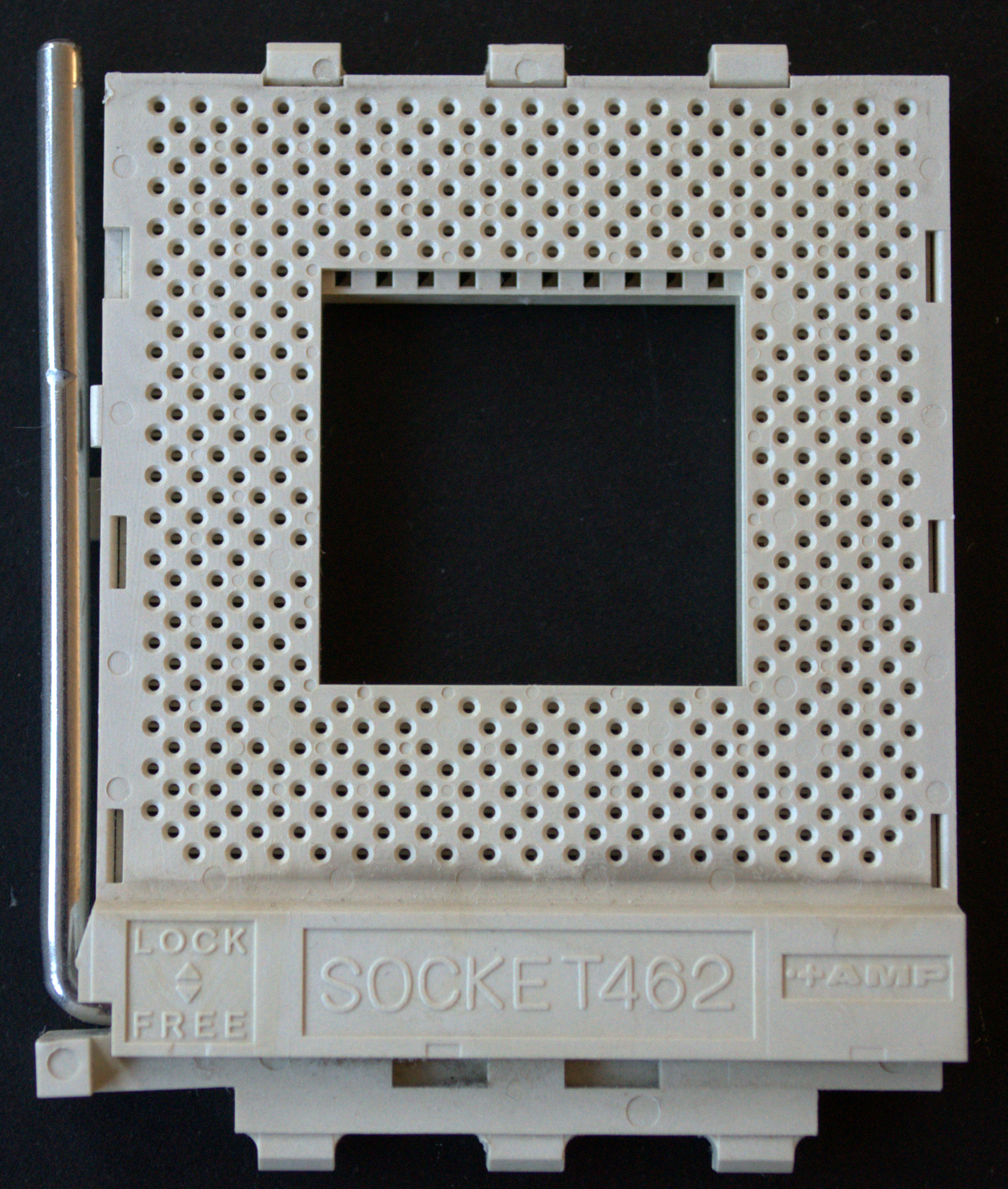
- Release date: 2000-06
- Type: PGA-ZIF
- Chip form factors: Ceramic Pin Grid Array (CPGA); Organic Pin Grid Array (OPGA)
- Contacts: 462
- FSB protocol: EV6
- FSB frequency: 200 MT/s, 266 MT/s, 333 MT/s, 400 MT/s
- Voltage range: 1.0–2.05V
- Processor dimensions: 49.53 mm × 49.53 mm
- Processors: AMD Athlon (600–1400 MHz); AMD Athlon XP (850–2333 MHz); AMD Duron (600–1800 MHz); AMD Sempron (1500–2200 MHz); AMD Athlon MP (1000–2133 MHz); AMD Geode NX (667–1800 MHz)
- Predecessor: Slot A
- Successor: Socket 754; Socket 939; Socket 940
- Memory support: DDR
- This article is part of the CPU socket series

Socket 462 (also known as Socket A, not to be confused with the socket of the same name used for the PPC G3 processors) is a zero insertion force pin grid array (PGA) CPU socket used for AMD processors ranging from the Athlon Thunderbird to the Athlon XP/MP 3200+, and AMD budget processors including the Duron and Sempron. Socket A also supports AMD Geode NX embedded processors (derived from the Mobile Athlon XP). It compliments (and later supersedes) the prior Slot A CPU interface used in some Athlon Thunderbird processors. The front-side bus frequencies supported for the AMD Athlon XP and Sempron are 133 MHz, 166 MHz, and 200 MHz. Socket A supports 32-bit CPUs only.

The socket is a zero insertion force pin grid array type with 462 pins, hence the name "Socket 462" printed on the CPU socket. About nine pins in the socket are blocked to discourage accidental insertion of Socket 370 CPUs on Socket A motherboards.

Socket A was replaced by Socket 754 and Socket 939 during 2003 and 2004 respectively, except for its use with Geode NX processors.

== Technical specifications ==
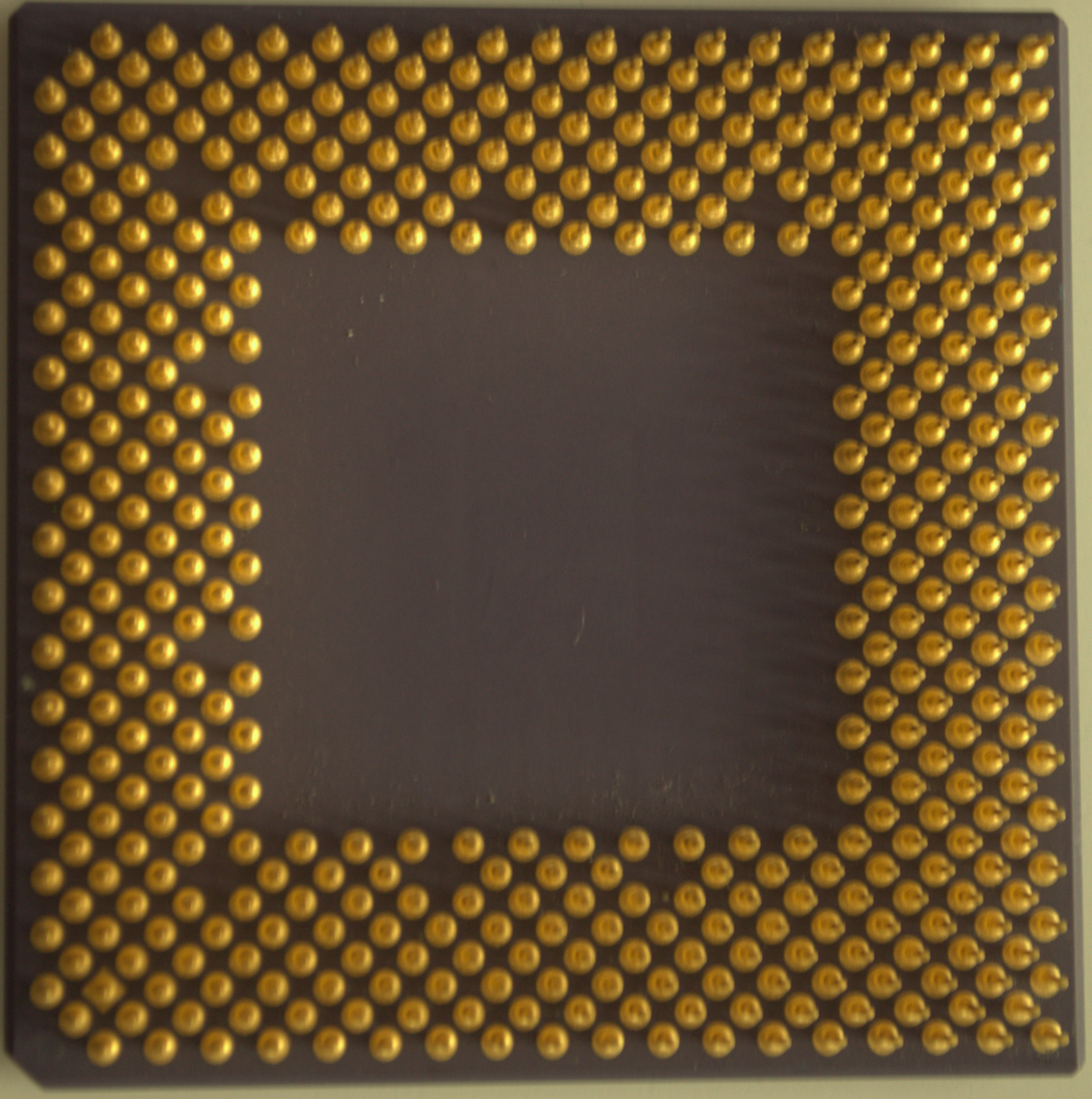
Underside of an 800 MHz Socket 462 Athlon CPU

- Support of processor clock-speeds between 600 MHz (Duron) to 2333 MHz (Athlon XP 3200+)
- Double data rate 100, 133, 166 and 200 MHz front-side bus on Duron, XP and Sempron processors, based on the Alpha 21264 EV6 bus.
  - Initially launched with 100 MHz FSB support in the earliest chipsets it evolved stepwise to faster 200 MHz FSB while maintaining pin compatibility throughout its lifetime. However, clock, timing, BIOS and voltage differences restrict compatibility between older chipsets and later processors.
- Socket dimensions are 5.59 cm (5.24 cm without lever) × 6.55 cm or 2.2" (2.06" without lever) × 2.58", slightly bigger than Socket 370 sockets.

== Heatsink ==
Heatsinks were commonly attached directly to the CPU socket, but some motherboards also had 4 holes for fastening bigger heatsinks to the motherboard. Those holes are placed in a rectangle with lateral lengths of 35 mm and 65 mm.

== Socket A mechanical load limits ==
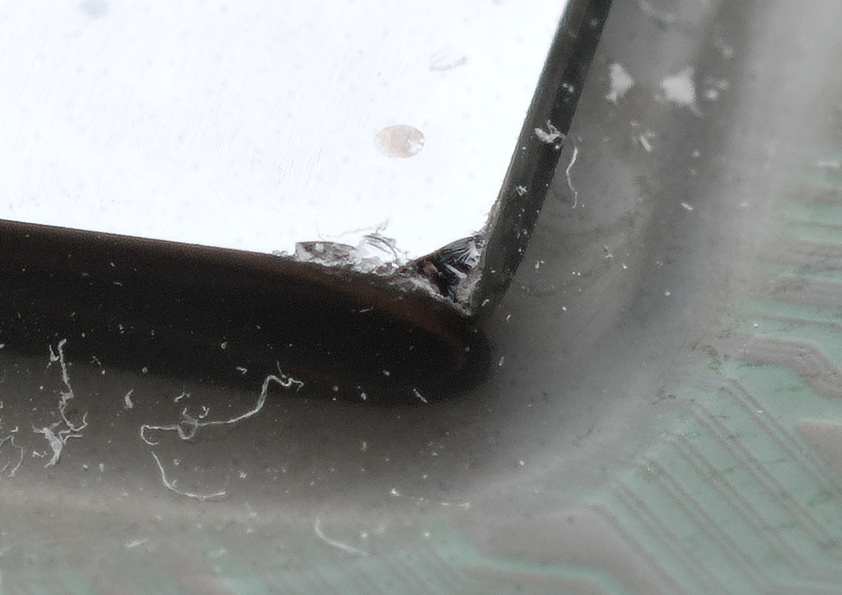
The corners of the exposed CPU dies were susceptible to damage like shown here when coolers were installed incorrectly or systems were handled roughly.

AMD recommends that the mass of a Socket A CPU cooler must not exceed 300 grams (10.6 ounces). Heavier coolers may result in damage to the die when the system is improperly handled, as seen in the picture on the right.

All Socket A processors (Athlon, Sempron, Duron and Geode NX) have the following mechanical maximum load limits which should not be exceeded during heatsink assembly, shipping conditions, or standard use. They came with a warning that load above those limits may crack the processor die and make it unusable. The limits are included in the table below.

Location	Dynamic	Static
Die Surface	445 N (100 lb_{f})	133 N (30 lb_{f})
Die Edge	44 N (10 lb_{f})	44 N (10 lb_{f})

These load limits are quite small compared to the load limits of Socket 370, Socket 423 and Socket 478 processors. Indeed, they were so small that many users more often than not ended up with cracked processors while attempting to remove or attach heatsinks to the fragile processor core. This makes installing non-standard or non-certified heatsink solutions a risky business. OEM aluminium heatsinks typically provided smaller thermal tolerances, so the improper application or absence of a thermal pad or grease or operation in high room temperatures may cause some Socket A CPUs to overheat and crash, rendering them useless.

== Chipsets ==
AMD offered official chipsets for the Slot A/Socket A CPUs. These are included in the table below.

Model	Code name	Released	CPU support	FSB/HT (MHz)	Southbridge	Features / Notes
AMD-750 chipset	AMD-751	August 1999	Athlon, Duron (Slot A, Socket A), Alpha 21264	100 (200MT/s)	AMD-756, VIA-VT82C686A	AGP 2×, SDRAM; Irongate chipset family; early steppings had issues with AGP 2×; drivers often limited support to AGP 1×; later fixed with "super bypass" memory access adjustment.
AMD-760 chipset	AMD-761	Nov 2000	Athlon, Athlon XP, Duron (Socket A), Alpha 21264	133 (266MT/s)	AMD-766, VIA-VT82C686B	AGP 4×, DDR SDRAM

Third-party chipsets include the nForce, nForce2, and a large number of VIA K-series chipsets.

In practice, third-party chipsets were heavily favoured by motherboard manufacturers. Stability problems and compatibility quirks from these chipsets abounded from manufacturers not following chipset designers' guidelines. This caused long-lasting damage to AMD's reputation, despite AMD having nothing to do with the poorly-realised hardware. A similar incident happened with third-party chipsets for Super Socket 7 CPUs, of which AMD tried to remedy it by putting quality assurance measures for the Athlon, which used Slot A/Socket A CPUs. Despite this, however, this was not enough to prevent the aforementioned problems mentioned above, and this phenomenon still lingered on for quite a while, even for Athlon CPUs.

== See also ==
- List of AMD microprocessors
