= Sempron =

Marketing name by AMD

General information
- Launched: July 28, 2004 to April 2014
- Common manufacturer: AMD

Performance
- Max. CPU clock rate: 1.0 GHz to 2.9 GHz
- FSB speeds: 166 MHz to 2700 MHz

Physical specifications
- Cores: 1, 2, 4
- Sockets: Socket A; Socket 754; Socket 939; AM2; Socket S1; AM3; FM1; FM2; AM1

Architecture and classification
- Technology node: 130 nm to 28 nm
- Instruction set: x86, AMD64

Products, models, variants
- Core names: Thoroughbred-B/Thorton; Barton; Paris; Palermo; Manila; Sparta; Brisbane; Sargas; Regor

History
- Predecessor: Duron
- Successor: AMD APU (indirect successor)

Sempron has been the marketing name used by AMD for several different budget desktop CPUs, using several different technologies and CPU socket formats. The Sempron replaced the AMD Duron processor and competed against Intel's Celeron series of processors. AMD coined the name from the Latin semper, which means "always", to suggest the Sempron is suitable for "daily use, practical, and part of everyday life".

The brand's initial processors were very similar to its predecessor, the Duron. The last Semprons were launched in April 2014. The brand was retired with the launch of the AMD A-Series APUs.

== History and features ==
The first Sempron CPUs were based on the Athlon XP architecture using the Thoroughbred or Thorton core. These models were equipped with the Socket A interface, 256 KiB L2 cache and 166 MHz Front side bus (FSB 333). Thoroughbred cores natively had 256 KiB L2 cache, but Thortons had 512 KiB L2 cache, half of which was disabled and could sometimes be reactivated with a slight physical modification to the chip. Later, AMD introduced the Sempron 3000+ CPU, based on the Barton core with 512 KiB L2 cache. From a hardware and user standpoint, the Socket A Sempron CPUs were essentially identical to Athlon XP desktop CPUs with a new brand name.

The second generation (Paris/Palermo core) was based on the architecture of the Socket 754 Athlon 64. Some differences from Athlon 64 processors include a reduced cache size (either 128 or 256 KiB L2), and the absence of AMD64 support in earlier models. Apart from these differences, the Socket 754 Sempron CPUs share most features with the more powerful Athlon 64, including an integrated (on-die) memory controller, the HyperTransport link, and AMD's "NX bit" feature.

In the second half of 2005, AMD added 64-bit support (AMD64) to the Sempron line. Some journalists (but not AMD) often refer to this revision of chips as "Sempron 64" to distinguish it from the previous revision. AMD's intent in releasing 64-bit entry-level processors was to extend the market for 64-bit processors, which at the time of Sempron 64's first release, was a niche market.

In 2006, AMD announced the Socket AM2 and Socket S1 line of Sempron processors. These are functionally equivalent to the previous generation, except they have a dual-channel DDR2 SDRAM memory controller which replaces the single-channel DDR SDRAM version. The TDP of the standard version remains at 62 W (watts), while the new "Energy Efficient Small Form Factor" version has a reduced 35 W TDP. The Socket AM2 version also does not require a minimum voltage of 1.1 volts to operate, whereas all socket 754 Semprons with Cool'n'Quiet did. In 2006, AMD was selling both Socket 754 and Socket AM2 Sempron CPUs concurrently. In the middle of 2007 AMD appears to have dropped the 754 line and is shipping AM2 and S1 Semprons.

AMD Sempron processor family
Logo	Desktop			Logo	Laptop		
Logo	Code-named	Core	Date released	Logo	Code-named	Core	Date released
Sempron logo as of 2004	Thoroughbred; Thorton; Barton; Paris; Palermo; Manila	130 nm 130 nm 130 nm 130 nm 90 nm 90 nm	Jul 2004; Aug 2004; Sep 2004; Jul 2004; Aug 2004; May 2006	Sempron logo as of 2004	Dublin; Georgetown; Sonora; Albany; Roma; Keene	130 nm 130 nm 90 nm 90 nm 90 nm 90 nm	Jul 2004; May 2005; Nov 2004; Jul 2005; Jul 2005; May 2006
Sempron logo as of 2007	Sparta; Brisbane; Sargas	65 nm 65 nm 45 nm	Aug 2007; Mar 2008; July 2009	Sempron logo as of 2007	Sherman; Sable; Huron	65 nm 65 nm 65 nm	May 2007; Jun 2008; Jan 2009
List of AMD Sempron microprocessors

== Models for Socket A (Socket 462) ==
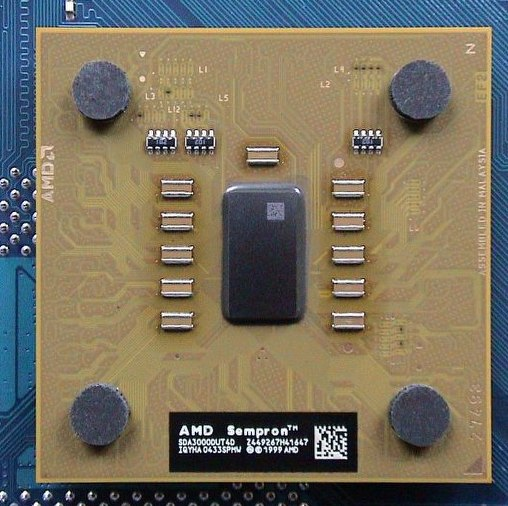
Sempron 3000+ (Barton)

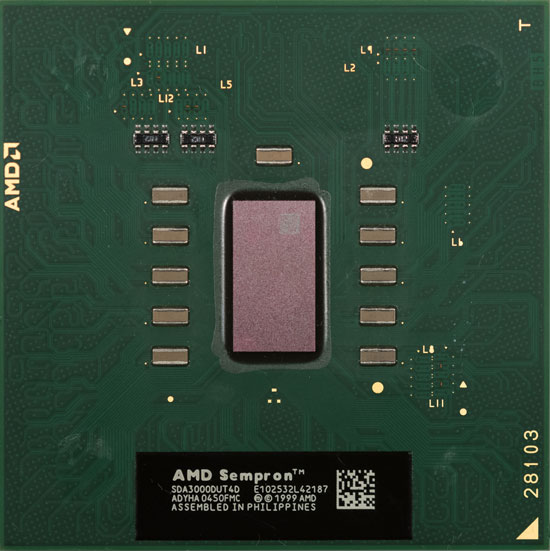
Top view of AMD Sempron 3000+ (SDA30000DUT4D)

=== Thoroughbred B/Thorton (130 nm) ===
- L1-Cache: 64 + 64 KiB (Data + Instructions)
- L2-Cache: 256 KiB, full speed
- MMX, 3DNow!, SSE
- Socket A (EV6)
- Front side bus: 166 MHz (FSB 333)
- VCore: 1.6 V
- First release: July 28, 2004
- Clockrate: 1500 MHz – 2000 MHz (2200+ to 2800+)

=== Barton (130 nm) ===
- L1-Cache: 64 + 64 KiB (Data + Instructions)
- L2-Cache: 512 KiB, full speed
- MMX, 3DNow!, SSE
- Socket A (EV6)
- Front side bus: 166 MHz – 200 MHz (FSB 333 – 400)
- VCore: 1.6 – 1.65 V
- First release: September 17, 2004
- Clockrate: 2000–2200 MHz (Sempron 3000+, Sempron 3300+)

== Models for Socket 754 ==
=== Paris (130 nm SOI) ===
- L1-Cache: 64 + 64 KiB (Data + Instructions)
- L2-Cache: 256 KiB, full speed
- MMX, 3DNow!, SSE, SSE2
- Enhanced Virus Protection (NX bit)
- Integrated 72-bit (Single channel, ECC capable) DDR memory controller
- Socket 754, 800 MHz HyperTransport
- VCore: 1.4 V
- First release: July 28, 2004
- Clockrate: 1800 MHz (3100+)
- Stepping: CG (Part No.: *AX)

=== Palermo (90 nm SOI) ===
- Early models (stepping D0) are downlabeled "Oakville" mobile Athlon64
- L1-Cache: 64 + 64 KiB (Data + Instructions)
- L2-Cache: 128/256 KiB, full speed
- MMX, 3DNow!, SSE, SSE2
- SSE3 support on E3 and E6 steppings
- AMD64 on E6 stepping
- Cool'n'Quiet (Sempron 3000+ and higher)
- Enhanced Virus Protection (NX bit)
- Integrated 72-bit (Single channel, ECC capable) DDR memory controller
- Socket 754, 800 MHz HyperTransport
- VCore: 1.4 V
- First release: February 2005
- Clockrate: 1400–2000 MHz
  - 128 KiB L2-Cache (Sempron 2600+, 3000+, 3300+)
  - 256 KiB L2-Cache (Sempron 2500+, 2800+, 3100+, 3400+)
- Steppings: D0 (Part No.: *BA), E3 (Part No.: *BO), E6 (Part No.: *BX)

== Models for Socket 939 ==
=== Palermo (90 nm SOI) ===
- L1-Cache: 64 + 64 KiB (Data + Instructions)
- L2-Cache: 128/256 KiB, full speed
- MMX, 3DNow!, SSE, SSE2, SSE3, AMD64 (E6 Steppings Only), Cool'n'Quiet, NX bit
- Integrated 144-bit (Dual channel, ECC capable) DDR memory controller
- Socket 939, 800 MHz HyperTransport
- VCore: 1.35/1.4 V
- First release: October 2005
- Clockrate: 1800–2000 MHz
  - 128 KiB L2-Cache (Sempron 3000+, 3400+)
  - 256 KiB L2-Cache (Sempron 3200+, 3500+)
- Steppings: E3 (Part No.: *BP), E6 (Part No.: *BW)

== Models for Socket AM2 ==
=== Manila (90 nm SOI) ===
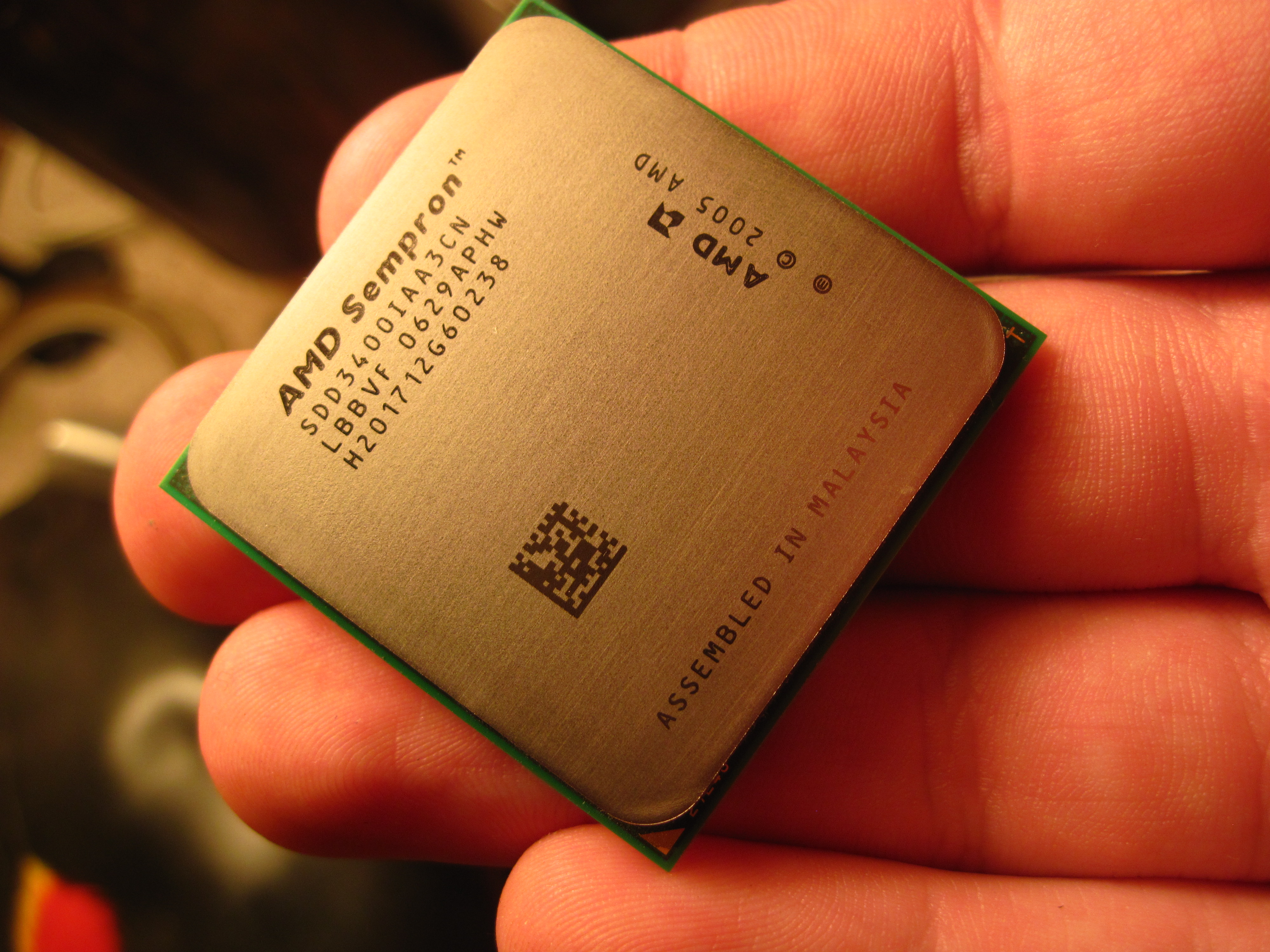
AMD Sempron 3400+

- L1-Cache: 64 + 64 KiB (Data + Instructions)
- L2-Cache: 128/256 KiB, full speed
- MMX, Extended 3DNow!, SSE, SSE2, SSE3, AMD64, Cool'n'Quiet, NX bit
- Integrated 128-bit (Dual channel) DDR2 memory controller
- Socket AM2, 800 MHz HyperTransport
- VCore: 1.25/1.35/1.40 V (1.20/1.25 V for Energy Efficient SFF version)
- First release: May 23, 2006
- Clockrate: 1600–2200 MHz
  - 128 KiB L2-Cache (Sempron 2800+, 3200+, 3500+)
  - 256 KiB L2-Cache (Sempron 3000+, 3400+, 3600+, 3800+)
- Stepping: F2 (Part No.: *CN, *CW)

=== Sparta (65 nm SOI) ===
- L1-Cache: 64 + 64 KiB (Data + Instructions)
- L2-Cache: 256/512 KiB, full speed
- MMX, Extended 3DNow!, SSE, SSE2, SSE3, AMD64, Cool'n'Quiet, NX bit
- Integrated 128-bit (Dual channel) DDR2 memory controller
- Socket AM2, 800 MHz HyperTransport
- VCore: 1.20/1.40 V
- First release: August 20, 2007
- Clockrate: 1900–2300 MHz
  - 256 KiB L2-Cache (Sempron LE-1100, LE-1150)
  - 512 KiB L2-Cache (Sempron LE-1200, LE-1250, LE-1300)
- Stepping: G1 (Part No.: *DE), G2 (Part No.: *DP)

== Models for Socket AM3 ==
=== Sargas (45 nm SOI) ===
- Chip harvests from Regor with one core disabled
- Core Speed (MHz) – 2600–2900
- Max Temps (C): 63
- VCore: 1.35 V
- TDP: 45 W
- L1 Cache Size (KB) 128
- L2 Cache Size (KB) 1024
- CPU Arch : 1 CPU – 1 Cores – 1 Threads
- CPU EXT : MMX(+) 3DNow!(+) SSE SSE2 SSE3 SSE4A x86-64 AMD-V, Cool'n'Quiet, NX bit
- Integrated 128-bit (Dual Channel) DDR2 + DDR3 Memory Controller
- Socket AM3, 2000 MHz HyperTransport
- Steppings: C2, C3

== Models for Socket S1 (638) ==
=== Keene (90 nm SOI) ===
- L1-Cache: 64 + 64 KiB (Data + Instructions)
- L2-Cache: 256 or 512 KiB, full speed
- MMX, Extended 3DNow!, SSE, SSE2, SSE3, AMD64, Cool'n'Quiet, NX bit
- Integrated 128-bit (Dual channel) DDR2 memory controller
- Socket S1, 800 MHz HyperTransport
- VCore: 0.950-1.25 V
- First release: May 17, 2006
- Clockrate: 1000–2000 MHz
  - 256 KiB L2-Cache (Sempron 2100+, 3400+)
  - 512 KiB L2-Cache (Sempron 3200+, 3500+, 3600+)
- Stepping: F2 (Part No.: *CM)

=== Sable (65 nm SOI) ===
- L1-Cache: 64 + 64 KiB (Data + Instructions)
- L2-Cache: 512 KiB, full speed
- MMX, Extended 3DNow!, SSE, SSE2, SSE3, AMD64, Cool'n'Quiet, NX bit
- Integrated 128-bit (Dual channel) DDR2 memory controller
- Socket S1, 1600 MHz HyperTransport
- VCore: 0.950-1.25 V
- First release: January 8, 2009
- Clockrate: 2000–2100 MHz 25w
  - 512 KiB L2-Cache

== Models for ASB1 package (BGA) ==
=== Huron (65 nm SOI) ===
- L1-Cache: 64 + 64 KiB (Data + Instructions)
- L2-Cache: 256 KiB, full speed
- MMX, Extended 3DNow!, SSE, SSE2, SSE3, AMD64, Cool'n'Quiet, NX bit
- Integrated 128-bit (Dual channel) DDR2 memory controller
- ASB1 package, 800 MHz HyperTransport
- VCore: ?
- First release: January 8, 2009
- Clockrate: 1000–1500 MHz
  - 256 KiB L2-Cache (Sempron 200U) 1000 MHz TDP 8 W
  - 256 KiB L2-Cache (Sempron 210U) 1500 MHz TDP 15 W
- Stepping: ? (Part No.: *DV)

== Models for Socket 754 32-bit Semprons ==
Max P-State	Model	Manufacturing process	Part number (OPN)
1600 MHz	2600+	0.09 micrometre	SDA2600AIO2BA(some parts are 64-bit)
1600 MHz	2800+	0.09 micrometre	SDA2800AIO3BA
1800 MHz	3000+	0.13 micrometre	SDA3000AIP2AX
1800 MHz	3100+	0.13 micrometre	SDA3100AIP3AX
1800 MHz	3100+	0.09 micrometre	SDA3100AIO3BA
2000 MHz	3300+	0.09 micrometre	SDA3300AIO2BA
2000 MHz	3400+	0.09 Micrometre	SDA3400AIO3BX

== Models for Socket S1 (638) 64-bit Semprons ==
Max P-State	Model	Manufacturing process	Part number (OPN)
1000 MHz	800	0.09 micrometre	TBA
1600 MHz	3200	0.09 micrometre	SMS3200HAX4CM
1800 MHz	3400	0.09 micrometre	SMS3400HAX3CM
1800 MHz	3500	0.09 micrometre	SMS3500HAX4CM
2000 MHz	3600	0.09 micrometre	SMS3600HAX3CM

== FM2/FM2+ Semprons ==
- Model 240, 3.3 GHz/2.9 GHz, 1MB cache, 65W
- Model 250, 3.6 GHz/3.2 GHz, 1MB cache, 65W, Piledriver microarchitecture, Richland core

== Models for Socket AM1 ==
Model number	Cores	Frequency	L2-Cache	HyperTransport	Mult ^{2}	Voltage	TDP	Release date	Part number(s)
Sempron 2650	2	1.45 GHz	1 MB	—N/a	14.5x	Unknown	25 W	April 9, 2014	SD2650JAH23HM
Sempron 3850	4	1.30 GHz	2 MB	—N/a	13x	Unknown	25 W	April 9, 2014	SD3850JAH44HM

== Semprons without Cool'n'Quiet ==
AMD has released some Sempron processors without Cool'n'Quiet support. The following table describes those processors lacking Cool'n'Quiet.

Max P-State	Min P-State	Model	Operating mode	Package-socket	Manufacturing process	Part number (OPN)
1400 MHz	N/A	2500+	32/64	Socket 754	0.09 micrometre	SDA2500AIO3BX
1600 MHz	N/A	2600+	32 or 32/64	Socket 754	0.09 micrometre	SDA2600AIO2BA
1600 MHz	N/A	2600+	32/64	Socket 754	0.09 micrometre	SDA2600AIO2BX
1600 MHz	N/A	2800+	32	Socket 754	0.09 micrometre	SDA2800AIO3BA
1600 MHz	N/A	2800+	32/64	Socket 754	0.09 micrometre	SDA2800AIO3BX
1600 MHz	N/A	2800+	32/64	Socket AM2	0.09 micrometre	SDA2800IAA2CN
1600 MHz	N/A	3000+	32/64	Socket AM2	0.09 micrometre	SDA3000IAA3CN
1600 MHz	N/A	3000+	32/64	Socket AM2	0.09 micrometre	SDA3000IAA4CN

== See also ==
- List of AMD Sempron microprocessors
