= Socket S1 =

CPU socket for laptop AMD CPUs

- Type: PGA-ZIF
- Contacts: 638
- FSB frequency: up to 800 MHz HyperTransport
- Processor dimensions: 35 mm × 35 mm
- Processors: Athlon 64 X2; Turion 64 X2; Mobile Sempron; Turion 64 (MK series only)
- Predecessor: Socket 563; Socket 754
- Successor: Socket FS1
- This article is part of the CPU socket series

Socket S1 is the CPU socket type used by AMD for their Turion 64, Athlon 64 Mobile, Phenom II Mobile and later Sempron processors, which debuted with the dual-core Turion 64 X2 CPUs on May 17, 2006.

== Technical specifications ==
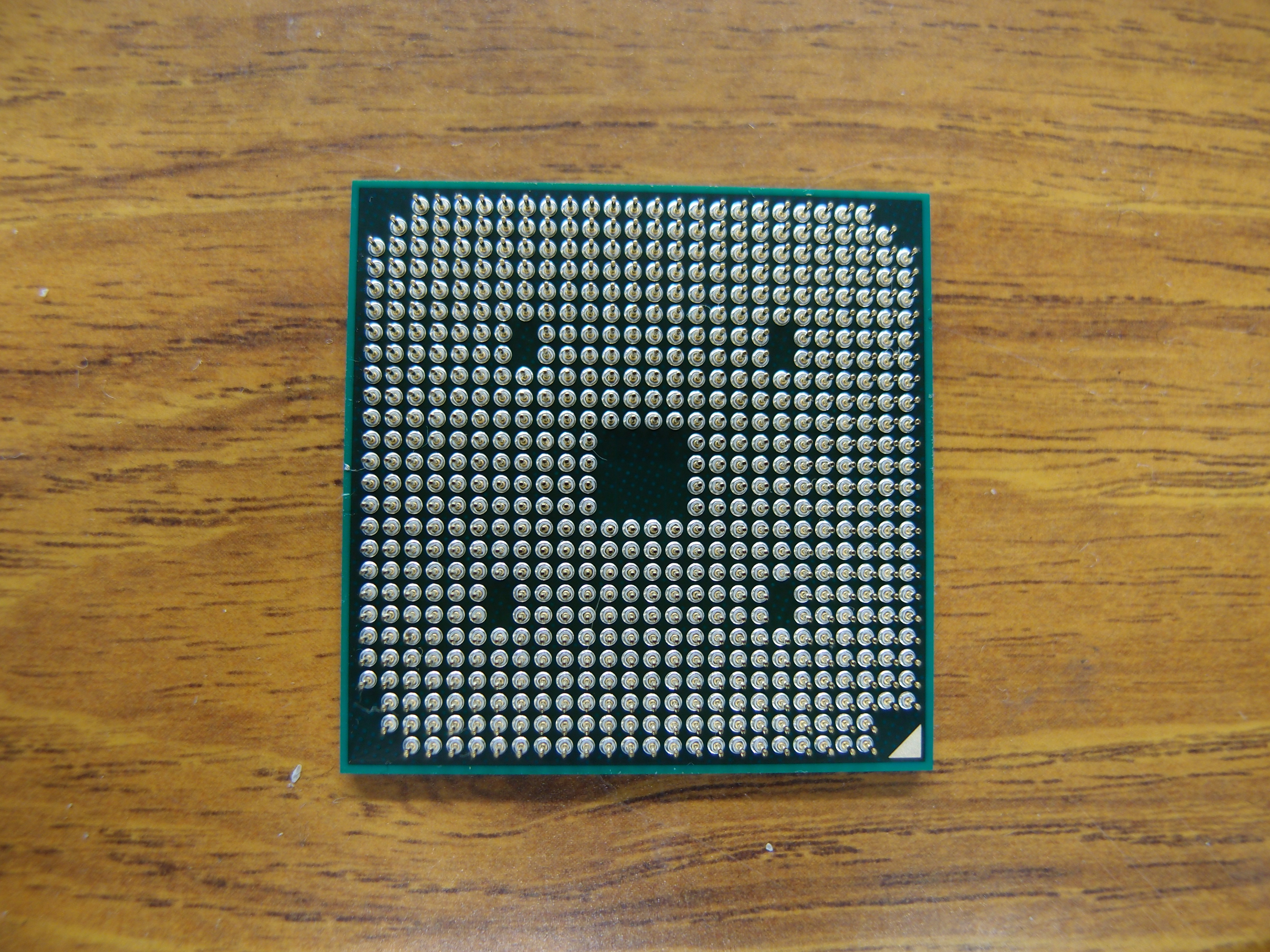
AMD Athlon II P320 with Socket S1 layout

Socket S1 is a 638 pin, low profile, ZIF, 1.27mm pitch socket. It replaces the existing Socket 754 in the mobile computing segment (e.g. laptops) as well as the microPGA Socket 563 form factor.

Socket S1 CPUs can include support for dual-channel DDR2 SDRAM, dual-core mobile CPUs, and virtualization technology, and compete with the mobile Intel Core 2 processor series.

=== Socket S1 revisions ===
Different generations of processors used various pinouts of the S1 socket; processors were not necessarily electrically-compatible with each socket even if they fit mechanically.

- Socket S1g1 or just S1
  - Platforms: Kite and Kite Refresh
  - CPUs: K8 core, HyperTransport 1.0, DDR2 memory
- Socket S1g2
  - Platforms: Puma and Yukon
  - CPUs: K8 Revision G core, HyperTransport 3.0, DDR2 memory
  - Added:
    - Split-power planes and linked power management support
    - Support for possible low voltage processors
- Socket S1g3
  - Platforms: Tigris
  - CPUs: K10.5 core, HyperTransport 3.0, DDR2 memory
- Socket S1g4
  - Platforms: Danube
  - CPUs: K10.5 core, HyperTransport 3.0, DDR3 memory

== See also ==
- List of AMD microprocessors
