= Underclocking =

Practice of decreasing the clock rate of a computer

Underclocking, also known as downclocking, is modifying a computer or electronic circuit's timing settings to run at a lower clock rate than is specified. Underclocking is used to reduce a computer's power consumption, increase battery life, reduce heat emission, and it may also increase the system's stability, lifespan/reliability and compatibility. Underclocking may be implemented by the factory, but many computers and components may be underclocked by the end user. Underclocking is the opposite of overclocking.

== Types ==
=== CPU underclocking ===
For microprocessors, the purpose is generally to decrease the need for heat dissipation devices or decrease the electrical power consumption. This can provide increased system stability in high-heat environments, or can allow a system to run with a lower airflow (and therefore quieter) cooling fan or without one at all. For example, a Pentium 4 processor normally clocked at 3.4 GHz can be "underclocked" to 2 GHz and can then be safely ran with reduced fan speeds. This invariably comes at the expense of some system performance. However, the proportional performance reduction is usually less than the proportional reduction in clock speed because performance is often limited by other bottlenecks: the hard disk, GPU, disk controller, network, etc. Underclocking refers to alterations of the timing of a synchronous circuit in order to lower a device's energy needs. Deliberate underclocking involves limiting a processor's speed, which may affect the speed of operations, but may or may not make a device noticeably less able, depending on other hardware and desired use.

Many computers and other devices allow for underclocking. Manufacturers add underclocking options for many reasons. Underclocking can help with excessive heat buildup, because lower performance will not generate as much heat inside the device. It can also lower the amount of energy needed to run the device. Laptop computers and other battery-operated devices often have underclocking settings, so that batteries can last longer without being charged.

In addition to providing underclocking features, manufacturers can choose to limit the capability of a machine in order to make it more efficient. Reduced instruction set computer (RISC) models can help makers build devices that work on less power.

=== Graphics cards ===
Underclocking can also be performed on graphics card processor's GPUs, usually with the aim of reducing heat output. For instance, it is possible to set a GPU to run at lower clock rates when performing everyday tasks (e.g. internet browsing and word processing), thus allowing the card to operate at lower temperature and thus lower, quieter fan speeds. The GPU can then be overclocked for more graphically intense applications, such as games. Underclocking a GPU will reduce performance, but this decrease will probably not be noticeable except in graphically intensive applications.

=== Memory underclocking ===
Newer and faster RAM may be underclocked to match older systems as an inexpensive way to replace rare or discontinued memory. This might also be necessary if stability problems are encountered at higher settings, especially in a PC with several memory modules of different clock speed. If a PC processor is underclocked, and the clock factor or multiplier (the ratio between the processor and the memory clock speed) is unchanged, the memory will also be underclocked.

== When used ==
Dynamic frequency scaling (automatic underclocking) is very common on laptop computers and has become common on desktop computers as well. In laptops, the processor is usually underclocked automatically whenever the computer is operating on batteries. Most modern notebook and desktop processors (utilizing power-saving schemes like AMD's Cool'n'Quiet and PowerNow!) will underclock themselves automatically under a light processing load, when the machine BIOS and the operating system support it. Intel has also used this method on numerous processors through a feature called SpeedStep. SpeedStep first appeared on chips like the Core 2 Duo and selective Pentium models, later becoming a standard in mid to high-end Core i3, i5, and i7 models.

Some processors underclock automatically as a defensive measure, to prevent overheating which could cause permanent damage. When such a processor reaches a temperature level deemed too high for safe operation, the thermal control circuit activates, automatically decreasing the clock and CPU core voltage until the temperature has returned to a safe level. In a properly cooled environment, this mechanism should trigger rarely (if ever).

There are several different underclocking competitions similar in format to overclocking competitions, except the goal is to have the lowest clocked computer, as opposed to the highest.

== Advantages ==
- Reduced electrical power consumption, especially when combined with undervolting (i.e., reducing the component's voltage below the nominal). For instance, by underclocking an Athlon XP 1700+ processor from 1466 to 1000 MHz and reducing the core voltage from 1.75 to 1.15V, a computer user reduced the power consumption from 64.0 to 21.6W, i.e., 66% power reduction, with only 26% less performance. The same is true for newer processors: When a single-core Intel CPU was 20% underclocked, the PC's performance was down only 13% with a 49% power reduction.

In general, the power consumed by a CPU with a capacitance C, running at frequency f and voltage V is approximately

$$P = C V^2 f.$$

- Reduced heat generation, which is exactly proportional to the power consumption.
- Less noise because the cooling fans may be slowed down, or even eliminated. A cooling fan's efficiency is proportional to its rotation speed, but as it increases, so does the noise.
- Longer hardware lifespan.
- Increased stability.
- Increased battery life.
- Better compatibility with old applications.
- Proper performance of very old computer games that were dependent on CPU timing.

== In practice ==
=== Linux ===
The Linux kernel supports CPU frequency modulation. In supported processors, using cpufreq to gain access to this feature gives the system administrator a variable level of control over the CPU's clock rate. The kernel includes six governors by default: Conservative, Ondemand, Performance, Powersave, Userspace and Schedutil. The Conservative and Ondemand governors adjust the clock rate depending on the CPU load, but each with different algorithms. The Ondemand governor jumps to maximum frequency on CPU load and decreases the frequency step by step on CPU idle, whereas the Conservative governor increases the frequency step by step on CPU load and jumps to lowest frequency on CPU idle. The Performance, Powersave and Userspace governors set the clock rate statically: Performance to the highest available, Powersave to the lowest available, and Userspace to a frequency determined and controlled by the user. The Schedutil governor estimates the load through the scheduler's Per-Entity Load Tracking (PELT) mechanism.

=== Windows ===
Underclocking can be done manually in the BIOS or with Windows applications, or dynamically using features such as Intel's SpeedStep or AMD's Cool'n'Quiet. In Windows 7 and 10, underclocking can be set within the "advanced" settings of a power management plan.

=== Asus Eee PC ===
Earlier models of the Asus Eee PC used a 900 MHz Intel Celeron M processor underclocked to 630 MHz.

=== Mac OS X ===
Underclocking can be performed in the EFI.

=== Smartphones and PDAs ===
Most smartphones and PDAs, such as the Motorola Droid, Palm Pre, and Apple iPhone, use underclocking of a more powerful processor, rather than the full clocking of a less powerful processor, to maximize battery life. The designers for such mobile devices often discover that a slower processor gives worse battery life than a more powerful processor at a lower clock rate. They select a processor on the basis of the performance per watt of the processor.

=== Performance ===
The performance of an underclocked machine will often be better than might be expected. Under normal desktop use, the full power of the CPU is rarely needed. Even when the system is busy, a large amount of time is usually spent waiting for data from memory, disk, or other devices. Such devices communicate with the CPU through a bus which operates at a much lower bandwidth. Generally, the lower the CPU multiplier (and thus clockrate of a CPU), the closer its performance will be to that of the bus, and the less time it will spend waiting.

== See also ==
- big.LITTLE
