= List of AMD Sempron processors =

The Sempron is a name used for AMD's low-end CPUs, replacing the Duron processor. The name was introduced in 2004, and processors with this name continued to be available for the FM2/FM2+ socket in 2015.

== Desktop processors ==
=== Sempron ===
==== "Thoroughbred-B" (Socket A, 130 nm, Model 8) ====
- All models support: MMX, SSE, Enhanced 3DNow!

Model number	Frequency	L2-Cache	Front-Side Bus	Mult (Note: Socket A processors use a double data rate (DDR) front-side bus, meaning that the actual data transfer rate of the bus is twice its physical clock rate. Socket A Semprons use a 333 MT/s FSB, which is a DDR 166 MHz FSB. The multipliers in the tables above apply to the 166 MHz physical clock rate, not the true data transfer rate.)	Voltage	TDP	Release date	Part number(s)
Sempron 2200+	1500 MHz	256 KB	333 MT/s	9x	1.60 V	62 W	July 28, 2004	SDA2200DUT3D
Sempron 2300+	1583 MHz	256 KB	333 MT/s	9.5x	1.60 V	62 W	July 28, 2004	SDA2300DUT3D
Sempron 2400+	1667 MHz	256 KB	333 MT/s	10x	1.60 V	62 W	July 28, 2004	SDA2400DUT3D
Sempron 2500+	1750 MHz	256 KB	333 MT/s	10.5x	1.60 V	62 W	July 28, 2004	SDA2500DUT3D
Sempron 2600+	1833 MHz	256 KB	333 MT/s	11x	1.60 V	62 W	July 28, 2004	SDA2600DUT3D
Sempron 2800+	2000 MHz	256 KB	333 MT/s	12x	1.60 V	62 W	July 28, 2004	SDA2800DUT3D

==== "Thorton" (Socket A, 130 nm, Model 10) ====
- All models support: MMX, SSE, Enhanced 3DNow!

Model number	Frequency	L2-Cache	Front-Side Bus	Mult	Voltage	TDP	Release date	Part number(s)
Sempron 2200+	1500 MHz	256 KB	333 MT/s	9x	1.60 V	62 W	July/August 2004	SDC2200DUT3D
Sempron 2400+	1667 MHz	256 KB	333 MT/s	10x	1.60 V	62 W	July/August 2004	SDC2400DUT3D
Sempron 2600+	1833 MHz	256 KB	333 MT/s	11x	1.60 V	62 W	July/August 2004	SDC2600DUT3D
Sempron 2800+	2000 MHz	256 KB	333 MT/s	12x	1.60 V	62 W	July/August 2004	SDC2800DUT3D

==== "Barton" (Socket A, 130 nm, Model 10) ====
- All models support: MMX, Extended MMX, SSE, 3DNow!, Enhanced 3DNow!

Model number	Frequency	L2-Cache	Front-Side Bus	Mult	Voltage	TDP	Release date	Part number(s)
Sempron 3000+	2000 MHz	512 KB	333 MT/s	12x	1.60 V	62 W	September 17, 2004	SDA3000DUT4D
Sempron 3300+	2200 MHz	512 KB	400 MT/s	11x	1.65 V	64 W	September 17, 2004	SDA3300DKV4E

==== "Paris" (Socket 754, CG, 130 nm) ====
- All models support: MMX, SSE, SSE2, Enhanced 3DNow!, NX bit

Model number	Frequency	L2-Cache	HyperTransport	Mult (Note: For traditional processors, including the Socket A Semprons, the multiplier is the value multiplied to the speed of the FSB to get the clock speed of the processor. Socket 754, 939, and S1 processors have a memory controller integrated on the CPU die, replacing the traditional concept of FSB. The memory controller runs at the same frequency as the CPU itself, and is able to run the system memory at 200 MHz (using PC-3200 memory sticks for 754 and 939, PC2-5300 for S1) or at lower speeds (when using slower PC-1600, PC-2100 or PC-2700 RAM). Between CPU and chipset, HyperTransport is used, running at 800 MHz for Semprons. The multipliers here apply to the 200 MHz system clock frequency, not the HyperTransport speed.)	Voltage	TDP	Release date	Part number(s)
Sempron 3000+	1800 MHz	128 KB	800 MHz	9x	1.40 V	62 W	February 15, 2005	SDA3000AIP2AX
Sempron 3100+	1800 MHz	256 KB	800 MHz	9x	1.40 V	62 W	July 28, 2004	SDA3100AIP3AX

==== "Palermo" (Socket 754, D0, E3 & E6, 90 nm) ====
- All models support: MMX, SSE, SSE2, Enhanced 3DNow!, NX bit
- SSE3 supported by: all models with an OPN ending in BO and BX
- AMD64 supported by: all models with an OPN ending in BX and CV
- Cool'n'Quiet supported by: 3000+ and higher models

Model number	Frequency	L2-Cache	HyperTransport	Mult	Voltage	TDP	Release date	Part number(s)
Sempron 2500+	1400 MHz	256 KB	800 MHz	7x	1.40 V	62 W	July 7, 2005	SDA2500AIO3BX
Sempron 2600+	1600 MHz	128 KB	800 MHz	8x	1.40 V	62 W	August 2004	SDA2600AIO2BA; SDA2600AIO2BO; SDA2600AIO2BX; SDA2600AIO2CV
Sempron 2800+	1600 MHz	256 KB	800 MHz	8x	1.40 V	62 W	August 2004	SDA2800AIO3BA; SDA2800AIO3BO; SDA2800AIO3BX; SDA2800AIO3CV
Sempron 3000+	1800 MHz	128 KB	800 MHz	9x	1.40 V	62 W	April 2005	SDA3000AIO2BA; SDA3000AIO2BO; SDA3000AIO2BX; SDA3000AIO2CV
Sempron 3100+	1800 MHz	256 KB	800 MHz	9x	1.40 V	62 W	April 2005	SDA3100AIO3BA; SDA3100AIO3BO; SDA3100AIO3BX; SDA3100AIO3CV
Sempron 3300+	2000 MHz	128 KB	800 MHz	10x	1.40 V	62 W	April 2005	SDA3300AIO2BA; SDA3300AIO2BO; SDA3300AIO2BX; SDA3300AIO2CV
Sempron 3400+	2000 MHz	256 KB	800 MHz	10x	1.40 V	62 W	1 August 2005	SDA3400AIO3BX

==== "Palermo" (Socket 939, E3 & E6, 90 nm) ====
- All models support: MMX, SSE, SSE2, SSE3, Enhanced 3DNow!, NX bit
- AMD64 supported by: all models with an OPN ending in BW

Model number	Frequency	L2-Cache	HyperTransport	Mult	Voltage	TDP	Release date	Part number(s)
Sempron 3000+	1800 MHz	128 KB	800 MHz	9x	1.35-1.40 V	62 W	October 2005	SDA3000DIO2BP; SDA3000DIO2BW; SDA3000DIO2BI
Sempron 3200+	1800 MHz	256 KB	800 MHz	9x	1.35-1.40 V	62 W	October 2005	SDA3200DIO3BP; SDA3200DIO3BW
Sempron 3400+	2000 MHz	128 KB	800 MHz	10x	1.35-1.40 V	62 W	October 2005	SDA3400DIO2BW
Sempron 3500+	2000 MHz	256 KB	800 MHz	10x	1.35-1.40 V	62 W	October 2005	SDA3500DIO3BW

==== "Manila" (Socket AM2, F2, 90 nm) ====
- All models support: MMX, SSE, SSE2, SSE3, Enhanced 3DNow!, NX bit, AMD64
- Cool'n'Quiet supported by: 3200+ and higher models

Model number	Frequency	L2-Cache	HyperTransport	Mult	Voltage	TDP	Release date	Part number(s)
Sempron 2800+	1600 MHz	128 KB	800 MHz	8x	1.25-1.40 V	62 W	23 May 2006	SDA2800IAA2CN
Sempron 3000+	1600 MHz	256 KB	800 MHz	8x	1.25-1.40 V	62 W	23 May 2006	SDA3000IAA3CN
Sempron 3200+	1800 MHz	128 KB	800 MHz	9x	1.25-1.40 V	62 W	23 May 2006	SDA3200IAA2CN; SDA3200IAA2CW
Sempron 3400+	1800 MHz	256 KB	800 MHz	9x	1.25-1.40 V	62 W	23 May 2006	SDA3400IAA3CN; SDA3400IAA3CW
Sempron 3500+	2000 MHz	128 KB	800 MHz	10x	1.25-1.40 V	62 W	23 May 2006	SDA3500IAA2CN
Sempron 3600+	2000 MHz	256 KB	800 MHz	10x	1.25-1.40 V	62 W	23 May 2006	SDA3600IAA3CN; SDA3600IAA3CW
Sempron 3800+	2200 MHz	256 KB	800 MHz	11x	1.25-1.40 V	62 W	23 Oct 2006	SDA3800IAA3CN

==== "Manila" (Socket AM2, Energy Efficient Small Form Factor, F2, 90 nm) ====
- All models support: MMX, SSE, SSE2, SSE3, Enhanced 3DNow!, NX bit, AMD64
- Cool'n'Quiet supported by: 3200+ and higher models

Model number	Frequency	L2-Cache	HyperTransport	Mult	Voltage	TDP	Release date	Part number(s)
Sempron 3000+	1600 MHz	256 KB	800 MHz	8x	1.20/1.25 V	35 W	23 May 2006	SDD3000IAA3CN
Sempron 3200+	1800 MHz	128 KB	800 MHz	9x	1.20/1.25 V	35 W	23 May 2006	SDD3200IAA2CN
Sempron 3400+	1800 MHz	256 KB	800 MHz	9x	1.20/1.25 V	35 W	23 May 2006	SDD3400IAA3CN
Sempron 3500+	2000 MHz	128 KB	800 MHz	10x	1.20/1.25 V	35 W	23 May 2006	SDD3500IAA2CN

==== "Sparta" (Socket AM2, Energy Efficient, G1 & G2, 65 nm) ====
- All models support: MMX, SSE, SSE2, SSE3, Enhanced 3DNow!, NX bit, AMD64, Cool'n'Quiet

Model number	Frequency	L2-Cache	HyperTransport	Mult	Voltage	TDP	Release date	Part number(s)
Sempron LE-1100	1900 MHz	256 KB	800 MHz	9.5x	1.20/1.40 V	45 W	October 8, 2007	SDH1100IAA3DE
Sempron LE-1150	2000 MHz	256 KB	800 MHz	10x	1.20/1.40 V	45 W	August 20, 2007	SDH1150IAA3DE
Sempron LE-1200	2100 MHz	512 KB	800 MHz	10.5x	1.20/1.40 V	45 W	Unknown	SDH1200IAA4DE
Sempron LE-1200 (G2)	2100 MHz	512 KB	800 MHz	10.5x	1.20/1.40 V	45 W	October 8, 2007	SDH1200IAA4DP
Sempron LE-1250 (G2)	2200 MHz	512 KB	800 MHz	11x	1.20/1.40 V	45 W	October 8, 2007	SDH1250IAA4DP
Sempron LE-1300 (G2)	2300 MHz	512 KB	800 MHz	11.5x	1.20/1.40 V	45 W	January 7, 2008	SDH1300IAA4DP

==== "Brisbane" (Socket AM2, Dual-core, G1 & G2, 65 nm) ====
- All models support: MMX, SSE, SSE2, SSE3, Enhanced 3DNow!, NX bit, AMD64, Cool'n'Quiet

Model number	Frequency	L2-Cache	HyperTransport	Mult	Voltage	TDP	Release date	Part number(s)
Sempron X2 2100 (G1)	1800 MHz	2 x 256 KB	800 MHz	9x		65 W	March 2008	SDO2100IAA4DD
Sempron X2 2100 (G2)	1800 MHz	2 x 256 KB	800 MHz	9x		65 W	March 2008	SDO2100IAA4DO
Sempron X2 2200 (G2)	2000 MHz	2 x 256 KB	800 MHz	10x		65 W	March 2008	SDO2200IAA4DO
Sempron X2 2300 (G2)	2200 MHz	2 x 256 KB	800 MHz	11x		65 W	April 2008	SDO2300IAA4DO

==== "Sargas" (Socket AM3, Single-core, C2 & C3, 45 nm) ====
- Chip harvests from Regor with one core disabled
- All models support: MMX, SSE, SSE2, SSE3, SSE4a, ABM, Enhanced 3DNow!, NX bit, AMD64, Cool'n'Quiet, AMD-V

Model number	Frequency	L2-Cache	HyperTransport	Mult	Voltage	TDP	Release date	Part number(s)
Sempron 130 (C2)	2.6 GHz	512 KB	2 GHz	13x	0.825 - 1.35	45 W	Q2 2011	SDX130HBK12GQ
Sempron 140 (C2)	2.7 GHz	1 MB	2 GHz	13.5x	0.825 - 1.35	45 W	July 2009	SDX140HBK13GQ
Sempron 145 (C3)	2.8 GHz	1 MB	2 GHz	14x	0.825 - 1.35	45 W	September 2010	SDX145HBK13GM
Sempron 150 (C3)	2.9 GHz	1 MB	2 GHz	14.5x	0.825 - 1.35	45 W	December 7, 2010	SDX150HBK13GM

==== "Regor" (Socket AM3, Dual-core, C3, 45 nm) ====
- All models support: MMX, SSE, SSE2, SSE3, SSE4a, ABM, Enhanced 3DNow!, NX bit, AMD64, Cool'n'Quiet, AMD-V

Model number	Frequency	L2-Cache	HyperTransport	Mult	Voltage	TDP	Release date	Part number(s)
Sempron 180	2.4 GHz	2x 512 KB	2 GHz	12x	0.825 - 1.35 V	45 W	Q3 2010	SDX180HDK22GM
Sempron 190	2.5 GHz	2x 512 KB	2 GHz	12.5x	0.825 - 1.35 V	45 W	Q3 2011	SDX190HDK22GM

==== FM2/FM2+ Semprons (Socket FM2, Dual-core, 32 nm) ====
- Piledriver microarchitecture, Trinity/Richland core
- All models support: MMX, SSE, SSE2, SSE3, SSSE3, SSE4a, SSE4.1, SSE4.2, AMD64, AMD-V, AES, CLMUL, AVX, XOP, FMA3, FMA4, F16C, ABM, BMI1, TBM

Model number	Frequency	Max. Turbo	L2-Cache	HyperTransport	Mult	Voltage	TDP	Release date	Part number(s)
Sempron 240	2.9 GHz	3.3 GHz	2x 512 KB	Unknown	Unknown	Unknown	65 W	Unknown	SD240XOKA23HJ
Sempron 250	3.2 GHz	3.6 GHz	2x 512 KB	Unknown	Unknown	Unknown	65 W	Unknown	SD250XOKA23HL

==== "Kabini" (Socket AM1, Dual-core or Quad-core, 28 nm) ====
- All models support: MMX, SSE, SSE2, SSE3, SSSE3, SSE4a, SSE4.1, SSE4.2, AMD64, AVX, F16C, CLMUL, AES, MOVBE (Move Big-Endian instruction), ABM, BMI1, AMD-V

Model number	Cores	Frequency	L2-Cache	HyperTransport	Mult	Voltage	TDP	Release date	Part number(s)
Sempron 2650	2	1.45 GHz	1 MB	—N/a	14.5x	Unknown	25 W	April 9, 2014	SD2650JAH23HM
Sempron 3850	4	1.30 GHz	2 MB	—N/a	13x	Unknown	25 W	April 9, 2014	SD3850JAH44HM

== Mobile processors ==
=== Mobile Sempron ===
==== "Dublin" (Socket 754, CG, 130 nm, Desktop replacement) ====
- All models support: MMX, SSE, SSE2, Enhanced 3DNow!, NX bit

Model number	Frequency	L2-Cache	HyperTransport	Mult	Voltage	TDP	Release date	Part number(s)
Mobile Sempron 2600+	1600 MHz	128 KB	800 MHz	8x	0.95-1.4 V	13-62 W	July 28, 2004	SMN2600BIX2AY
Mobile Sempron 2800+	1600 MHz	256 KB	800 MHz	8x	0.95-1.4 V	13-62 W	July 28, 2004	SMN2800BIX3AY
Mobile Sempron 3000+	1800 MHz	128 KB	800 MHz	9x	0.95-1.4 V	13-62 W	July 28, 2004	SMN3000BIX2AY

==== "Dublin" (Socket 754, CG, 130 nm, Low power) ====
- All models support: MMX, SSE, SSE2, Enhanced 3DNow!, NX bit

Model number	Frequency	L2-Cache	HyperTransport	Mult	Voltage	TDP	Release date	Part number(s)
Mobile Sempron 2600+	1600 MHz	128 KB	800 MHz	8x	0.975-1.25 V	9-25 W	July 28, 2004	SMS2600BOX2LA
Mobile Sempron 2800+	1600 MHz	256 KB	800 MHz	8x	0.975-1.25 V	9-25 W	July 28, 2004	SMS2800BOX3LA

==== "Georgetown" (Socket 754, D0, 90 nm, Desktop replacement) ====
- All models support: MMX, SSE, SSE2, Enhanced 3DNow!, NX bit

Model number	Frequency	L2-Cache	HyperTransport	Mult	Voltage	TDP	Release date	Part number(s)
Mobile Sempron 2600+	1600 MHz	128 KB	800 MHz	8x	0.95-1.4 V	62 W	July 28, 2004	SMN2600BIX2BA
Mobile Sempron 2800+	1600 MHz	256 KB	800 MHz	8x	0.95-1.4 V	62 W		SMN2800BIX3BA
Mobile Sempron 3000+	1800 MHz	128 KB	800 MHz	9x	0.95-1.4 V	62 W	July 28, 2004	SMN3000BIX2BA
Mobile Sempron 3100+	1800 MHz	256 KB	800 MHz	9x	0.95-1.4 V	62 W	May 3, 2005	SMN3100BIX3BA
Mobile Sempron 3300+	2000 MHz	128 KB	800 MHz	10x	0.95-1.4 V	62 W	August 19, 2005	SMN3300BIX2BA

==== "Sonora" (Socket 754, D0, 90 nm, Low power) ====
- All models support: MMX, SSE, SSE2, Enhanced 3DNow!, NX bit

Model number	Frequency	L2-Cache	HyperTransport	Mult	Voltage	TDP	Release date	Part number(s)
Mobile Sempron 2600+	1600 MHz	128 KB	800 MHz	8x	0.975-1.25 V	25 W	July 28, 2004	SMS2600BOX2LB
Mobile Sempron 2800+	1600 MHz	256 KB	800 MHz	8x	0.975-1.25 V	25 W	July 28, 2004	SMS2800BOX3LB
Mobile Sempron 3000+	1800 MHz	128 KB	800 MHz	9x	0.975-1.25 V	25 W	November 23, 2004	SMS3000BOX2LB
Mobile Sempron 3100+	1800 MHz	256 KB	800 MHz	9x	0.975-1.25 V	25 W	January 2005	SMS3100BOX3LB

==== "Albany" (Socket 754, E6, 90 nm, Desktop replacement) ====
- All models support: MMX, SSE, SSE2, SSE3, Enhanced 3DNow!, NX bit

Model number	Frequency	L2-Cache	HyperTransport	Mult	Voltage	TDP	Release date	Part number(s)
Mobile Sempron 3000+	1800 MHz	128 KB	800 MHz	9x	0.95-1.4 V	62 W	July 15, 2005	SMN3000BIX2BX
Mobile Sempron 3100+	1800 MHz	256 KB	800 MHz	9x	0.95-1.4 V	62 W	July 15, 2005	SMN3100BIX3BX
Mobile Sempron 3300+	2000 MHz	128 KB	800 MHz	10x	0.95-1.4 V	62 W	July 15, 2005	SMN3300BIX2BX
Mobile Sempron 3400+	2000 MHz	256 KB	800 MHz	10x	0.95-1.4 V	62 W	January 23, 2006	SMN3400BIX3BX
Mobile Sempron 3600+	2200 MHz	128 KB	800 MHz	11x	0.95-1.4 V	62 W	May 17, 2006	SMN3600BIX2BX

==== "Roma" (Socket 754, E6, 90 nm, Low power) ====
- All models support: MMX, SSE, SSE2, SSE3, Enhanced 3DNow!, NX bit

Model number	Frequency	L2-Cache	HyperTransport	Mult	Voltage	TDP	Release date	Part number(s)
Mobile Sempron 2800+	1600 MHz	256 KB	800 MHz	8x	0.95-1.2 V	25 W	July 15, 2005	SMS2800BQX3LF
Mobile Sempron 3000+	1800 MHz	128 KB	800 MHz	9x	0.95-1.2 V	25 W	July 15, 2005	SMS3000BQX2LE; SMS3000BQX2LF
Mobile Sempron 3100+	1800 MHz	256 KB	800 MHz	9x	0.95-1.2 V	25 W	July 15, 2005	SMS3100BQX3LE SMS3100BQX3LF
Mobile Sempron 3300+	2000 MHz	128 KB	800 MHz	10x	0.95-1.2 V	25 W	July 2005	SMS3300BQX2LE; SMS3300BQX2LF
Mobile Sempron 3400+	2000 MHz	256 KB	800 MHz	10x	0.95-1.2 V	25 W	May 17, 2006	SMS3400BQX3LE

==== "Keene" (Socket S1, F2, 90 nm, Low power) ====
- All models support: MMX, SSE, SSE2, SSE3, Enhanced 3DNow!, NX bit, AMD64, PowerNow!

Model number	Frequency	L2-Cache	HyperTransport	Mult	Voltage	TDP	Release date	Part number(s)
Mobile Sempron 3200+	1600 MHz	512 KB	800 MHz	8x	0.950v - 1.125v	25 W	May 17, 2006	SMS3200HAX4CM
Mobile Sempron 3400+	1800 MHz	256 KB	800 MHz	9x	0.950v - 1.125v	25 W	May 17, 2006	SMS3400HAX3CM
Mobile Sempron 3500+	1800 MHz	512 KB	800 MHz	9x	0.950v - 1.125v	25 W	May 17, 2006	SMS3500HAX4CM
Mobile Sempron 3600+	2000 MHz	256 KB	800 MHz	10x	0.950v - 1.125v	25 W	Oct 23, 2006	SMS3600HAX3CM

==== "Sherman" (Socket S1, G1 & G2, 65 nm, Low power) ====
- All models support: MMX, SSE, SSE2, SSE3, Enhanced 3DNow!, NX bit, AMD64

Model number	Frequency	L2-Cache	HyperTransport	Mult	Voltage	TDP	Release date	Part number(s)
Sempron 2100+ fanless	1000 MHz	256 KB	800 MHz	5.25x	0.950v - 1.125v	9 W	May 30, 2007	SMF2100HAX3DQE (G1)
Mobile Sempron 3600+	2000 MHz	256 KB	800 MHz	10x		25 W		SMS3600HAX3DN (G2)
Mobile Sempron 3700+	2000 MHz	512 KB	800 MHz	10x		25 W		SMS3700HAX4DQE (G1)
Mobile Sempron 3800+	2200 MHz	256 KB	800 MHz	11x		31 W		SMD3800HAX3DN (G2)
Mobile Sempron 4000+	2200 MHz	512 KB	800 MHz	11x		31 W		SMD4000HAX4DN (G2)

==== "Sable" (65 nm) ====
- All models support: MMX, SSE, SSE2, SSE3, Enhanced 3DNow!, NX bit, AMD64, PowerNow!

Model number	Frequency	L2-Cache	HT	Multiplier	Voltage	TDP	Socket	Release date	Order Part Number
Sempron SI-40	2000 MHz	512 KB	1800 MHz	10x	0.950V - 1.125V	25 W	Socket S1	June 4, 2008	SMSI40SAM12GG
Sempron SI-42	2100 MHz	512 KB	1800 MHz	10.5x	0.950V - 1.125V	25 W	Socket S1	Q3 2008	SMSI42SAM12GG

==== "Huron" (65 nm, Low power) ====
- All models support: MMX, SSE, SSE2, SSE3, Enhanced 3DNow!, NX bit, AMD64, PowerNow!

Model number	Frequency	L2-Cache	HT	Multiplier	Voltage	TDP	Package/Socket	Release date	Order Part Number
Sempron for Ultra-thin notebooks/ Sempron 200U (Note: The CPU model number can be read directly from the OPN number, the fourth to the seventh letters represent the model number of the CPU. The "200U" model number is only used for embedded system products.)	1000 MHz	256 KB	1600 MHz	5x		8 W	ASB1	January 8, 2009	SMF200UOAX3DV
Sempron 210U	1500 MHz	256 KB	1600 MHz	7.5x		15 W	Socket S1	January 8, 2009	SMG210UOAX3DX

==== "Caspian" (45 nm) ====
- All models support: MMX, SSE, SSE2, SSE3, SSE4a, Enhanced 3DNow!, NX bit, AMD64, PowerNow!, AMD-V

Model number	Frequency	L2 cache	FPU width	HT	Multi	TDP	Socket	Release date	Order part number
Sempron M100	2000 MHz	512 KB	64-bit	1600 MHz	10x	25 W	Socket S1g3	September 10, 2009	SMM100SBO12GQ
Sempron M120	2100 MHz	512 KB	64-bit	1600 MHz	10.5x	25 W	Socket S1g3	September 10, 2009	SMM120SBO12GQ
Sempron M140	2200 MHz	512 KB	64-bit	1600 MHz	10.5x	25 W	Socket S1g3	April 2010	SMM140SBO12GQ

== See also ==
- Sempron
- List of AMD Athlon XP processors
- List of AMD Athlon 64 processors
- List of AMD Turion processors
- Table of AMD processors
