= XFR =

XFR may refer to:

- Jaguar XFR, an executive/mid-size luxury car
- eXtended Frequency Range, auto-boosting feature of AMD Ryzen microprocessors
- X-Force Red, an IBM global team that provides security testing services
- X-ray fluorescence, "secondary" emission of X-rays from material bombarded with high-energy X-rays or gamma rays
- XFR, a tech company that provides IT Infrastructure and Financial Services
