= SpeedStep =

Power management technique in computers

Intel Enhanced SpeedStep Technology
- Design firm: Intel
- Introduced: Q1 2005
- Type: Dynamic frequency scaling

Enhanced SpeedStep is a series of dynamic frequency scaling technologies (codenamed Geyserville and including SpeedStep, SpeedStep II, and SpeedStep III) built into some Intel's microprocessors that allow the clock speed of the processor to be dynamically changed (to different P-states) by software. This allows the processor to meet the instantaneous performance needs of the operation being performed, while minimizing power draw and heat generation. EIST (SpeedStep III) was introduced in several Prescott 6 series in the first quarter of 2005, namely the Pentium 4 660. Intel Speed Shift Technology (SST) was introduced with Intel's Skylake microarchitecture.

Enhanced Intel SpeedStep Technology is sometimes abbreviated as EIST. Intel's trademark of "Intel SpeedStep" was canceled due to the trademark being invalidated in 2012.

== Explanation ==
Running a processor at high clock speeds allows for better performance. However, when the same processor is run at a lower frequency (speed), it generates less heat and consumes less power. In many cases, the core voltage can also be reduced, further reducing power consumption and heat generation. By using SpeedStep, users can select the balance of power conservation and performance that best suits them, or even change the clock speed dynamically as the processor burden changes.

The power consumed by a CPU with a capacitance C, running at frequency f and voltage V is approximately:

$$P = C V^2 f$$

For a given processor, C is a fixed value. However, V and f can vary considerably. For example, for a 1.6 GHz Pentium M, the clock frequency can be stepped down in 200 MHz decrements over the range from 1.6 to 0.6 GHz. At the same time, the voltage requirement decreases from 1.484 to 0.956 V. The result is that the power consumption theoretically goes down by a factor of 6.4. In practice, the effect may be smaller because some CPU instructions use less energy per tick of the CPU clock than others. For example, when an operating system is not busy, it tends to issue x86 halt (HLT) instructions, which suspend operation of parts of the CPU for a time period, so it uses less energy per tick of the CPU clock than when executing productive instructions in its normal state. For a given rate of work, a CPU running at a higher clock rate will execute a greater proportion of HLT instructions. The simple equation which relates power, voltage and frequency above also does not take into account the static power consumption of the CPU. This tends not to change with frequency, but does change with temperature and voltage.

== Known issues ==
Microsoft has reported that there may be problems previewing video files when SpeedStep (or the AMD equivalent PowerNow!) is enabled under Windows 2000 or Windows XP.

== Operating system support ==
- Microsoft Windows supports Intel Speed Shift Technology since Windows 10.
- Under Microsoft Windows XP, SpeedStep support is built into the Power Management console under the Control Panel. In Windows XP a user can regulate processor speed indirectly by changing power schemes. The "Home/Office Desk" setting disables SpeedStep on AC power, the "Portable/Laptop" or the "Minimal Power Management" power scheme enables SpeedStep, and the "Max Battery" uses SpeedStep to slow the processor to minimal power levels as the battery weakens. The SpeedStep settings for power schemes, either built-in or custom, cannot be modified from Control Panel's GUI, but can be modified using the powercfg.exe command-line utility.
- Older versions of Microsoft Windows, Windows 2000 and earlier, need a special driver and dashboard application to access the SpeedStep feature. Intel's website specifically states that such drivers must come from the computer manufacturer; there are no generic drivers supplied by Intel which will enable SpeedStep for older Windows versions if one cannot obtain a manufacturer's driver.
- The Linux kernel has a subsystem called "cpufreq", tunable by power-scheme and command line, devoted to the control of the operating frequency and voltage of a CPU. Linux runs on Intel, AMD, and other makes of CPU.
- Solaris has supported SpeedStep since OpenSolaris SXDE 9/07.

In contrast, AMD has supplied and supported drivers for its competing PowerNow! technology that work on Windows 2000, ME, 98, and NT.

== See also ==
- Advanced Configuration and Power Interface – Computer firmware interface standard
- AMD PowerTune – Brand name by AMD
- AMD Turbo Core – Dynamic frequency scaling technology
- Cool'n'Quiet – Power saving mode of modern processors by Advanced Micro Devices
- CPU-Z – Freeware system profiling and monitoring application for Microsoft Windows and Android
- Intel Turbo Boost – Overclocking technology by Intel
- Power management – Feature of some electrical appliances
