= List of AMD K6 processors =

The AMD K6 microprocessor is the 2nd generation of x86-compatible 32-bit processors designed by AMD. The K6 core was derived from the NexGen Nx686 core being developed based on the RISC86 architecture.

== Desktop CPU ==
=== K6 (Model 6, K6, 350 nm) ===
- All models support: MMX

| Model number | Frequency | FSB | Multiplier | Voltage | TDP | Socket | Release date | Order part number(s) | Release price (USD) |
|---|---|---|---|---|---|---|---|---|---|
| K6 166 | 166 MHz | 66 MHz | 2.5x | 2.9 V | 17.2 W | Socket 7 | Apr 2, 1997 | AMD-K6-166ALR; AMD-K6-166ALYD | $244 |
| K6 200 | 200 MHz | 66 MHz | 3.0x | 2.9 V | 20.0 W | Socket 7 | Apr 2, 1997 | AMD-K6-200AFR; AMD-K6-200ALR; AMD-K6-200ALYD | $349 |
| K6 233 | 233 MHz | 66 MHz | 3.5x | 3.2 V | 28.3 W | Socket 7 | Apr 2, 1997 | AMD-K6-233AFR; AMD-K6-233ANR; AMD-K6-233APR | $469 |

=== K6 (Model 7, K6, 250 nm) ===
- All models support: MMX

| Model number | Frequency | FSB | Multiplier | Voltage | TDP | Socket | Release date | Order part number(s) | Release price (USD) |
|---|---|---|---|---|---|---|---|---|---|
| K6 266 | 266 MHz | 66 MHz | 4.0x | 2.2 V | 14.5 W | Socket 7 | Jan 6, 1998 | AMD-K6/266AFR | $156 |
| K6 300 | 300 MHz | 66 MHz | 4.5x | 2.2 V | 15.4 W | Socket 7 | Apr 7, 1998 | AMD-K6/300AFR | $246 |

=== K6-2 (Model 8, K6, 250 nm) ===
- All models support: MMX, 3DNow!

| Model number | Frequency | FSB | Multiplier | Voltage | TDP | Socket | Release date | Order part number(s) | Release price (USD) |
|---|---|---|---|---|---|---|---|---|---|
| K6-2 200 | 200 MHz | 66 MHz | 3.0x | 2.2 V | ? | Socket 7 | ? | AMD-K6-2/200AFR | ? |
| K6-2 233 | 233 MHz | 66 MHz | 3.5x | 2.2 V | ? | Socket 7 | ? | AMD-K6-2/233AFR | ? |
| K6-2 266 | 266 MHz | 66 MHz | 4.0x | 2.2 V | 14.7 W | Socket 7 | May 28, 1998 | AMD-K6-2/266AFR | $185 |
| K6-2 300 | 300 MHz | 66 MHz | 4.5x | 2.2 V | 17.2 W | Socket 7 | May 28, 1998 | AMD-K6-2/300AFR | $281 |
| K6-2 333 | 333 MHz | 66 MHz | 5.0x | 2.2 V | 19.0 W | Socket 7 | May 28, 1998 | AMD-K6-2/333AFR | $369 |
| K6-2 350 | 350 MHz | 100 MHz | 3.5x | 2.2 V | 19.9 W | Super Socket 7 | Aug 27, 1998 | AMD-K6-2/350AFQ; AMD-K6-2/350AFR | $317 |
| K6-2 366 | 366 MHz | 66 MHz | 5.5x | 2.2 V | 20.8 W | Socket 7 | Nov 16, 1998 | AMD-K6-2/366AFR | $187 |
| K6-2 380 | 380 MHz | 95 MHz | 4.0x | 2.2 V | 21.6 W | Super Socket 7 | Nov 16, 1998 | AMD-K6-2/380AFR | $213 |
| K6-2 400 | 400 MHz | 100 MHz | 4.0x | 2.2 V | 22.7 W | Super Socket 7 | Nov 16, 1998 | AMD-K6-2/400AFQ; AMD-K6-2/400AFR; AMD-K6-2/400AHX | $283 |
| K6-2 450 | 450 MHz | 100 MHz | 4.5x | 2.2 V | 28.4 W | Super Socket 7 | Feb 26, 1999 | AMD-K6-2/450AFX; AMD-K6-2/450AGX; AMD-K6-2/450AHX | $203 |
| K6-2 475 | 475 MHz | 95 MHz | 5.0x | 2.4 V | 29.6 W | Super Socket 7 | Apr 5, 1999 | AMD-K6-2/475AFX; AMD-K6-2/475AHX | $213 |
| K6-2 500 | 500 MHz | 100 MHz | 5.0x | 2.2 V 2.4 V | ? | Super Socket 7 | Aug 30, 1999 | AMD-K6-2/500AFX; AMD-K6-2/500AHX | $167 |
| K6-2 533 | 533 MHz | 97 MHz | 5.5x | 2.2 V | 20.7 W | Super Socket 7 | Nov 29, 1999 | AMD-K6-2/533AFX | $167 |
| K6-2 550 | 550 MHz | 100 MHz | 5.5x | 2.3 V | 25.0 W | Super Socket 7 | Feb 22, 2000 | AMD-K6-2/550AFX; AMD-K6-2/550AGR | $189 |

=== K6-III (Model 9, K6-III, 250 nm) ===
- All models support: MMX, 3DNow!

| Model number | Frequency | L2-Cache | FSB | Multiplier | Voltage | TDP | Socket | Release date | Order part number(s) | Release price (USD) |
|---|---|---|---|---|---|---|---|---|---|---|
| K6-III 333 | 333 MHz | 256 KB | 95 MHz | 3.5x | 2.2 V | ? | Super Socket 7 | ? | AMD-K6-III/333AFR | ? |
| K6-III 400 | 400 MHz | 256 KB | 100 MHz | 4.0x | 2.2 v 2.4 v | 18.1 W | Super Socket 7 | Feb 22, 1999 | AMD-K6-III/400AFR; AMD-K6-III/400AHX | $284 |
| K6-III 450 | 450 MHz | 256 KB | 100 MHz | 4.5x | 2.2 v 2.4 v | 20.2 W | Super Socket 7 | Feb 22, 1999 | AMD-K6-III/450AFX; AMD-K6-III/450AHX | $476 |

== Mobile CPU ==
=== Mobile K6 (Model 7, K6, 250 nm) ===
- All models support: MMX

| Model number | Frequency | FSB | Multiplier | Voltage | TDP | Socket | Release date | Order part number(s) | Release price (USD) |
|---|---|---|---|---|---|---|---|---|---|
| Mobile K6 233 | 233 MHz | 66 MHz | 3.5x | 2.0 V | 9.0 W | Socket 7 BGA | Jan 6, 1998 | AMD-K6/233ACZ; AMD-K6/233ADZ; AMD-K6/233BCZ | ? |
| Mobile K6 266 | 266 MHz | 66 MHz | 4.0x | 2.0 V | 9.8 W | Socket 7 BGA | ? | AMD-K6/266ACZ; AMD-K6/266ADZ; AMD-K6/266BCZ | ? |
| Mobile K6 300 | 300 MHz | 66 MHz | 4.5x | 2.1 V | 11.0 W | Socket 7 BGA | Sep 22, 1998 | AMD-K6/300ADZ; AMD-K6/300BDZ | $229 |

=== Mobile K6-2 (Model 8, K6-2, 250 nm) ===
- All models support: MMX, 3DNow!

| Model number | Frequency | FSB | Multiplier | Voltage | TDP | Socket | Release date | Order part number(s) | Release price (USD) |
|---|---|---|---|---|---|---|---|---|---|
| Mobile K6-2 266 | 266 MHz | 66 MHz | 4.0x | 1.8 V | 9.0 W | Socket 7 BGA | Jan 13, 1999 | AMD-K6-2/266ANZ; AMD-K6-2/266BNZ | $106 |
| Mobile K6-2 300 | 300 MHz | 100 MHz | 3.0x | 1.8 V | 10.0 W | Super Socket 7 BGA | Jan 13, 1999 | AMD-K6-2/300ANZ; AMD-K6-2/300BNZ | $187 |
| Mobile K6-2 333 | 333 MHz | 95 MHz | 3.5x | 1.8 V | 11.0 W | Super Socket 7 BGA | Jan 13, 1999 | AMD-K6-2/333ANZ; AMD-K6-2/333BNZ | $299 |
| Mobile K6-2 P 350 | 350 MHz | 100 MHz | 3.5x | 2.2 V | 15.0 W | Super Socket 7 | Mar 8, 1999 | AMD-K6-2/350AFK | $119 |
| Mobile K6-2 P 366 | 366 MHz | 66 MHz | 5.5x | 2.2 V | 16.0 W | Socket 7 | Mar 8, 1999 | AMD-K6-2/366AFK | $149 |
| Mobile K6-2 P 380 | 380 MHz | 95 MHz | 4.0x | 2.2 V | 16.0 W | Super Socket 7 | Mar 8, 1999 | AMD-K6-2/380AFK | $169 |
| Mobile K6-2-P 400 | 400 MHz | 100 MHz | 4.0x | 2.2 V | 16.0 W | Super Socket 7 | Jun 15, 1999 | AMD-K6-2/400ACK; AMD-K6-2/400AFK | $187 |
| Mobile K6-2-P 433 | 433 MHz | 96.2 MHz | 4.5x | 2.1 V | 16.0 W | Super Socket 7 | Sep 20, 1999 | AMD-K6-2/433ADK | $159 |
| Mobile K6-2-P 450 | 450 MHz | 100 MHz | 4.5x | 2.1 V | 16.0 W | Super Socket 7 | Sep 20, 1999 | AMD-K6-2/450ADK | $189 |
| Mobile K6-2-P 475 | 475 MHz | 95 MHz | 5.0x | 2.0 V | 16.0 W | Super Socket 7 | Sep 20, 1999 | AMD-K6-2/475ACK | $209 |
| Mobile K6-2-P 500 | 500 MHz | 100 MHz | 5.0x | 2.1 V | 20.0 W | Super Socket 7 | ? | AMD-K6-2/500ADK | ? |

=== Mobile K6-2+ (Model 13, K6-2+, 180 nm) ===
- All models support: MMX, 3DNow!

| Model number | Frequency | L2-Cache | FSB | Multiplier | Voltage | TDP | Socket | Release date | Order part number(s) | Release price (USD) |
|---|---|---|---|---|---|---|---|---|---|---|
| Mobile K6-2+ 450 | 450 MHz | 128 KB | 100 MHz | 4.5x | 2.0 V | 16.0 W | Super Socket 7 | Apr 18, 2000 | AMD-K6-2+/450ACZ; AMD-K6-2+/450ACZM; AMD-K6-2+/450ADZM | $85 |
| Mobile K6-2+ 475 | 475 MHz | 128 KB | 95 MHz | 5.0x | 2.0 V | 16.0 W | Super Socket 7 | Apr 18, 2000 | AMD-K6-2+/475ACZM; AMD-K6-2+/475ADZM | $98 |
| Mobile K6-2+ 500 | 500 MHz | 128 KB | 100 MHz | 5.0x | 2.0 V | 16.0 W | Super Socket 7 | Apr 18, 2000 | AMD-K6-2+/500ACZ; AMD-K6-2+/500ACZM | $112 |
| Mobile K6-2+ 533 | 533 MHz | 128 KB | 97 MHz | 5.5x | 2.0 V | 18.0 W | Super Socket 7 | Jun 26, 2000 | AMD-K6-2+/533ACZ; AMD-K6-2+/533ACZM | $85 |
| Mobile K6-2+ 550 | 550 MHz | 128 KB | 100 MHz | 5.5x | 2.0 V | 18.0 W | Super Socket 7 | Jun 26, 2000 | AMD-K6-2+/550ACZ | $99 |
| Mobile K6-2+ 570 | 570 MHz | 128 KB | 95 MHz | 6.0x | 2.0 V | ? | Super Socket 7 | ? | AMD-K6-2+/570ACZ | ? |

=== Mobile K6-III-P (Model 9, K6-III, 250 nm) ===
- All models support: MMX, 3DNow!

| Model number | Frequency | L2-Cache | FSB | Multiplier | Voltage | TDP | Socket | Release date | Order part number(s) | Release price (USD) |
|---|---|---|---|---|---|---|---|---|---|---|
| Mobile K6-III 333 | 333 MHz | 256 KB | 95 MHz | 3.5x | 2.2 V | ? | Super Socket 7 | ? | AMD-K6-III/333AFK | ? |
| Mobile K6-III-P 350 | 350 MHz | 256 KB | 100 MHz | 3.5x | 2.2 V | 16.0 W | Super Socket 7 | May 24, 1999 | AMD-K6-III/350AFK | $249 |
| Mobile K6-III-P 366 | 366 MHz | 256 KB | 66 MHz | 5.5x | 2.2 V | 16.0 W | Socket 7 | May 24, 1999 | AMD-K6-III/366AFK | $316 |
| Mobile K6-III-P 380 | 380 MHz | 256 KB | 95 MHz | 4.0x | 2.2 V | 16.0 W | Super Socket 7 | May 24, 1999 | AMD-K6-III/380AFK | $349 |
| Mobile K6-III-P 400 | 400 MHz | 256 KB | 100 MHz | 4.0x | 2.0 V | 16.0 W | Super Socket 7 | Sep 20, 1999 | AMD-K6-III/400ACK | $246 |
| Mobile K6-III-P 433 | 433 MHz | 256 KB | 96.2 MHz | 4.5x | 2.0 V | 16.0 W | Super Socket 7 | Sep 20, 1999 | AMD-K6-III/433ACK | $283 |
| Mobile K6-III-P 450 | 450 MHz | 256 KB | 100 MHz | 4.5x | 2.0 V | 16.0 W | Super Socket 7 | Sep 20, 1999 | AMD-K6-III/450ACK | $320 |

=== Mobile K6-III+ (Model 13, K6-III+, 180 nm) ===
- All models support: MMX, Enhanced 3DNow!, CnQ

| Model number | Frequency | L2-Cache | FSB | Multiplier | Voltage | TDP | Socket | Release date | Order part number(s) | Release price (USD) |
|---|---|---|---|---|---|---|---|---|---|---|
| Mobile K6-III+ 450 | 450 MHz | 256 KB | 100 MHz | 4.5x | 2.0 V | 16.0 W | Super Socket 7 | April 18, 2000 | AMD-K6-III+/450ACZ | $140 |
| Mobile K6-III+ 475 | 475 MHz | 256 KB | 95 MHz | 5.0x | 2.0 V | 16.0 W | Super Socket 7 | April 18, 2000 | AMD-K6-III+/475ACZ | $162 |
| Mobile K6-III+ 500 | 500 MHz | 256 KB | 100 MHz | 5.0x | 2.0 V | 16.0 W | Super Socket 7 | April 18, 2000 | AMD-K6-III+/500ACZ | $184 |

== Embedded CPU ==
=== Mobile K6-2E (Model 8, K6-2, 250 nm) ===
- All models support: MMX, 3DNow!, CnQ

| Model number | Frequency | FSB | Multiplier | Voltage | TDP | Socket | Release date | Order part number(s) | Release price (USD) |
|---|---|---|---|---|---|---|---|---|---|
| K6-2E 233 | 233 MHz | 66 MHz | 3.5x | 2.2 V 1.9 V | 13.5 W | Socket 7 | Jun 28, 1999 | AMD-K6-2E/233AFR; AMD-K6-2E/233AMZ | $55 $66 |
| K6-2E 266 | 266 MHz | 66 MHz | 4.0x | 2.2 V 1.9 V | 14.7 W | Socket 7 | Jun 28, 1999 | AMD-K6-2E/266AFR; AMD-K6-2E/266AMZ | $56 $69 |
| K6-2E 300 | 300 MHz | 100 MHz | 3.0x | 2.2 V 1.9 V | 17.2 W | Super Socket 7 | Jun 28, 1999; Dec 6, 1999 | AMD-K6-2E/300AFR; AMD-K6-2E/300AMZ | $59 $66 |
| K6-2E 333 | 333 MHz | 95 MHz | 3.5x | 2.2 V 1.9 V | 19.0 W | Super Socket 7 | Dec 6, 1999 | AMD-K6-2E/333AFR; AMD-K6-2E/333AMZ | $59 $69 |
| K6-2E 350 | 350 MHz | 100 MHz | 3.5x | 2.2/1.9 V | 19.9 W | Super Socket 7 | Dec 6, 1999 | AMD-K6-2E/350AFR; AMD-K6-2E/350AMZ | $61 |
| K6-2E 400 | 400 MHz | 100 MHz | 4.0x | 2.2 V | 16.9 W | Super Socket 7 | ? | AMD-K6-2E/400AFR | ? |

=== K6-2E+ (Model 13, K6-2+, 180 nm) ===
- All models support: MMX, 3DNow!

| Model number | Frequency | L2-Cache | FSB | Multiplier | Voltage | TDP | Socket | Release date | Order part number(s) | Release price (USD) |
|---|---|---|---|---|---|---|---|---|---|---|
| K6-2E+ 350 | 350 MHz | 128 KB | 100 MHz | 3.5x | 1.5 V | 7.5 W | Super Socket 7 BGA | Sep 25, 2000 | AMD-K6-2E+/350AUZ; AMD-K6-2E+/350IUZ | $71 |
| K6-2E+ 400 | 400 MHz | 128 KB | 100 MHz | 4.0x | 2.0 V 1.6 V | 9.5 W | Super Socket 7 BGA | Sep 25, 2000 | AMD-K6-2E+/400ACR; AMD-K6-2E+/400ATZ; AMD-K6-2E+/400ICR; AMD-K6-2E+/400ITZ | $66 $76 |
| K6-2E+ 450 | 450 MHz | 128 KB | 100 MHz | 4.5x | 2.0 V 1.7 V | 12.0 W | Super Socket 7 BGA | Sep 25, 2000 | AMD-K6-2E+/450ACR; AMD-K6-2E+/450APZ; AMD-K6-2E+/450ICR | $71 $82 |
| K6-2E+ 500 | 500 MHz | 128 KB | 100 MHz | 5.0x | 2.0 V | 18.5 W | Super Socket 7 | Sep 25, 2000 | AMD-K6-2E+/500ACR | $78 |

=== K6-IIIE+ (Model 13, K6-III+, 180 nm) ===
- All models support: MMX, Enhanced 3DNow!, CnQ

| Model number | Frequency | L2-Cache | FSB | Multiplier | Voltage | TDP | Socket | Release date | Order part number(s) | Release price (USD) |
|---|---|---|---|---|---|---|---|---|---|---|
| K6-IIIE+ 400 | 400 MHz | 256 KB | 100 MHz | 4.0x | 1.6 V | 9.5 W | Super Socket 7 BGA | Sep 25, 2000 | AMD-K6-III+/400ACR; AMD-K6-III+/400ATZ; AMD-K6-III+/400ICR; AMD-K6-III+/400ITZ | $89 |
| K6-IIIE+ 450 | 450 MHz | 256 KB | 100 MHz | 4.5x | 2.0 V 1.7 V | 12.0 W | Super Socket 7 BGA | Sep 25, 2000 | AMD-K6-III+/450ACR; AMD-K6-III+/450APZ; AMD-K6-III+/450ICR | $83 $94 |
| K6-IIIE+ 500 | 500 MHz | 256 KB | 100 MHz | 5.0x | 2.0 V 1.8 V | 14.5 W | Super Socket 7 | Sep 25, 2000 | AMD-K6-III+/500ACR; AMD-K6-III+/500ANZ | $91 $106 |
| K6-IIIE+ 550 | 550 MHz | 256 KB | 100 MHz | 5.5x | 2.0 V | 19.5 W | Super Socket 7 | Sep 25, 2000 | AMD-K6-III+/550ACR | $101 |
