= AMD PowerTune =

Brand name by AMD

- Design firm: Advanced Micro Devices
- Introduced: December 2011
- Type: Dynamic frequency scaling

AMD PowerTune is a series of dynamic frequency scaling technologies built into some AMD GPUs and APUs that allow the clock speed of the processor to be dynamically changed (to different P-states) by software. This allows the processor to meet the instantaneous performance needs of the operation being performed, while minimizing power draw, heat generation and noise avoidance. AMD PowerTune aims to solve thermal design power and performance constraints.

Besides the reduced energy consumption, AMD PowerTune helps to lower the noise levels created by the cooling in desktop computers, and extends battery life in mobile devices. AMD PowerTune is the successor to AMD PowerPlay.

The firmware for PowerTune is executed on the System Management Unit (SMU), which is a LatticeMico32 core, and was modeled using Matlab.

== Overview ==
Architecture of the PowerTune version, that was introduced with GCN1.1-chips, such as the Bonaire

AMD PowerTune was introduced in the TeraScale 3 (VLIW4) with Radeon HD 6900 on 15 December 2010 and has been available in different development stages on Radeon- and AMD FirePro-branded products ever since.

Over the years, reviews which document the development of AMD PowerTune have been published by AnandTech.

An additional technology named AMD ZeroCore Power has been available since the Radeon HD 7000 series, implementing the Graphics Core Next microarchitecture.

AMD’s PowerTune divides GPU power management into P-states (performance and frequency) and G-states (power gating of GPU and GPU shaders).

== Operating system support ==
Support for PowerTune is contained in the Linux kernel device driver amdgpu.

AMD Catalyst is available for Microsoft Windows and Linux and support AMD PowerTune.

The free and open-source "Radeon" graphics device driver has some support for AMD PowerTune.

== See also ==
- AMD Cool'n'Quiet (for desktop CPUs)
- AMD PowerNow! (for laptop CPUs)
- AMD Turbo Core (for CPUs)
- AMD PowerXpress (for multi-GPUs)
- Dynamic frequency scaling
- Intel SpeedStep (for CPUs)
- Intel Turbo Boost (for CPUs)
