= Power–delay product =

In digital electronics, the power–delay product (PDP) is a figure of merit correlated with the energy efficiency of a logic gate or logic family. Also known as switching energy, it is the product of power consumption P (averaged over a switching event) times the input–output delay or duration of the switching event D. It has the dimension of energy and measures the energy consumed per switching event.

In a CMOS circuit the switching energy and thus the PDP for a 0-to-1-to-0 computation cycle is C_{L}·V_{DD}^{2}. Therefore, lowering the supply voltage V_{DD} lowers the PDP.

Energy-efficient circuits with a low PDP may also be performing very slowly, thus energy–delay product (EDP), the product of E and D (or P and D^{2}), is sometimes a preferable metric.

In CMOS circuits the delay is inversely proportional to the supply voltage V_{DD} and hence EDP is proportional to V_{DD}. Consequently, lowering V_{DD} also benefits EDP.

== See also ==
- Voltage scaling
- Switching power
