= Intel Turbo Boost =

Overclocking technology by Intel

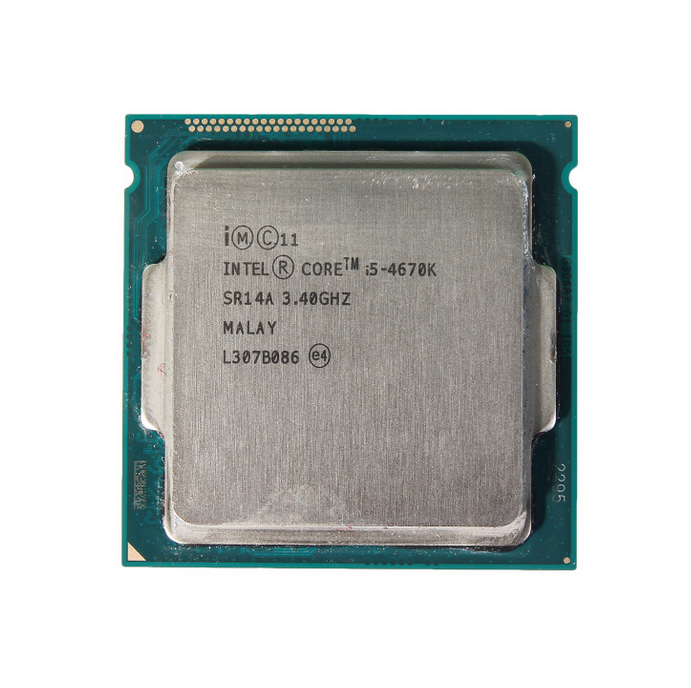

Intel Turbo Boost is Intel's trade name for a dynamic frequency scaling feature in certain versions of the company's central processing units (CPUs) that automatically raises the operating frequency beyond the processor's nominal frequency when demanding tasks are running, thus enabling a higher performance.

The frequency is accelerated when the operating system requests the highest performance state of the processor. Processor performance states are defined by the Advanced Configuration and Power Interface (ACPI) specification, an open standard supported by all major operating systems; no additional software or drivers are required to support the technology. The design concept behind Turbo Boost is commonly referred to as "dynamic overclocking".

When the workload on the processor calls for faster performance, the processor's clock will try to increase the operating frequency in regular increments as required to meet demand. The increased clock rate is limited by the processor's power, current, and thermal limits, the number of cores currently in use, and the maximum frequency of the active cores.

Turbo Boost is enabled on the Core i3, Core i5, Core i7, Core i9 and Xeon series of processors manufactured since 2008, more particularly, those based on the Nehalem, and later microarchitectures.

== Support across CPUs ==
Frequency increases occur in increments of 133 MHz for Nehalem processors and 100 MHz for Sandy Bridge, Ivy Bridge, Haswell and Skylake processors. When any electrical or thermal limits are exceeded, the operating frequency automatically decreases in decrements of 133 or 100 MHz until the processor is again operating within its design limits. Turbo Boost 2.0 was introduced in 2011 with the Sandy Bridge microarchitecture, while Intel Turbo Boost Max 3.0 was introduced in 2016 with the Broadwell-E microarchitecture.

A feature of Turbo Boost 2.0 is that it introduced time windows with different levels of power limits, so that a processor can boost to a higher frequency for a few seconds. These limits are configurable in software for unlocked processors. Some motherboard vendors intentionally use values higher than Intel's default for performance, causing the processor to exceed its thermal design power (TDP).

Some Intel Core X Processors and some newer Intel Core Processors (e.g. 10th-geneneration desktop Core i7) support Intel Turbo Boost Max 3.0 Technology, as well as the more aggressive Intel Thermal Velocity Boost Technology, those based on ACPI CPPC. Newer version Windows 10 and Linux kernel support Intel Turbo Boost Max 3.0 Technology and Intel Thermal Velocity Boost Technology.

== History ==
A white paper by Intel in November 2008 discusses "Turbo Boost" technology as a new feature incorporated into Nehalem-based processors released in the same month.

A similar feature called Intel Dynamic Acceleration (IDA) was first available with Core 2 Duo, which was based on the Santa Rosa platform and was released on May 10, 2007. This feature did not receive the marketing treatment given to Turbo Boost. Intel Dynamic Acceleration dynamically changed the core frequency as a function of the number of active cores. When the operating system instructed one of the active cores to enter C3 sleep state using the Advanced Configuration and Power Interface (ACPI), the other active core(s) dynamically accelerated to a higher frequency.

Intel Turbo Boost Technology Monitor, as a GUI utility, could be used to monitor Turbo Boost; this utility has reached the end-of-life state by no longer supporting Intel processors released after Q2 2013, and is no longer available.

== See also ==
- AMD PowerTune
- AMD Turbo Core
- Cool'n'Quiet
- Dynamic frequency scaling
- PowerNow!
- SpeedStep
- Turbo button
