= Intel Dynamic Acceleration =

Technology by Intel

Intel Dynamic Acceleration (IDA), sometimes called Dynamic Acceleration Technology (DAT), is a technology created by Intel Corp. in certain multi-core Intel microprocessors. It increases the clock rate of a single core for every two cores above its base operating frequency if the other cores are idle. It is designed for single-threaded programs to run faster on multi-core Intel microprocessors. Intel later released a version of IDA called enhanced Dynamic Acceleration Technology (eDAT) for its quad core processors that boosts the performance of 2 cores when only 2 cores are being utilized.

== History ==
Intel Dynamic Acceleration was first released with the Core 2 Duo mobile processor line, as new microprocessor lines were released, Intel changed the technology and naming scheme slightly.

== Dual Dynamic Acceleration ==
With the introduction of quad core processors, Intel modified IDA and released Dual Dynamic Acceleration (DDA).

== Intel Turbo Boost ==
The later released Nehalem microarchitecture of Intel microprocessors made additional changes to the original IDA and released an improved version called Intel Turbo Boost.

== Intel Dynamic Platform and Thermal Framework ==
Since 5th gen Intel Core CPUs, Dynamic Platform and Thermal Framework (DPTF) was introduced as a way to enable OEMs to individually set specific power and performance profiles tailored to each PC. It was later renamed to Dynamic Tuning Technology (DTT) as part of Intel Adaptix Technology.

== See also ==
- Overclocking
- Dynamic frequency scaling
