= AMD Turbo Core =

Dynamic frequency scaling technology

- Design firm: Advanced Micro Devices
- Introduced: 2010
- Type: Dynamic frequency scaling

Turbo Core, also known as Core Performance Boost (CPB) and Precision Boost (PB), is a dynamic frequency scaling technology developed by AMD, and implemented in their CPUs. CPB dynamically adjust a processor's clock rate and core voltage beyond its rated standard clock to increase performance, while keeping the processor's power consumption and heat output within limits. AMD Turbo Core technology has been implemented beginning with the Phenom II X6 microprocessors based on the AMD K10 microarchitecture. AMD Turbo Core is available with some AMD A-Series accelerated processing units.

AMD Turbo Core is similar to Intel Turbo Boost, which is another dynamic processor frequency adjustment technology used to increase performance, as well as AMD PowerNow!, which is used to dynamically adjust laptop processor's operating frequencies in order to decrease power consumption (saving battery life), reduce heat, and lower noise. AMD PowerNow! is used to decrease processor frequency, whereas AMD Turbo Core is used to increase processor frequency.

== Background ==
To decide a processor's clock speed, the processor is stress tested to determine the maximum speed that the processor can run at before the maximum amount of power allowed is reached, which is called thermal design power or TDP. It has been reported that customers would complain that the processors rarely consumed the rated TDP, which meant that most consumers do not come close to the power consumed during maximum stress testing. A parameter called average CPU power (ACP) is used to address this issue. ACP defines the average power expected to be consumed with regular use, whereas TDP gives the maximum power consumed. Power consumed is an important factor when considering thermal limits and determining CPU power dissipation.

AMD Turbo Core and similar dynamic processor frequency adjustment technologies take advantage of average power consumed being less than the maximum design limits, allowing frequency (and the accompanying power and heat) to be increased for short periods of time without exceeding design limits.

== Features ==
Advantages of AMD Turbo Core include:

- Up to 900 MHz of additional clock speed available with all cores active, meaning all cores can boost at the same time.
- Potentially even higher boost states available with half of the cores active, since fewer active cores require less power and generate less heat.
- Governed by power draw, not temperature, so that the same performance increase is available in warmer environments, so that maximum frequency is dependent on workload.

With the Ryzen processors, AMD has introduced extra auto-overclocking features:

- Precision Boost tries to run the processor at the highest frequency allowed at any moment, constrained by cooling and power supply. It changes frequency in 25 MHz increments. Precision Boost Overdrive was introduced in Zen+. Actual performance of Precision Boost depends on motherboard limitations and UEFI BIOS configurations.
- Extended Frequency Range unlocks default boost ranges for systems with better cooling.

== Processors supporting AMD Turbo Core ==
- Opteron
- AMD FX
- AMD APU
- AMD Ryzen
- AMD EPYC
- Some AMD Phenom II CPUs

== See also ==
- AMD Cool'n'Quiet (desktop CPUs)
- AMD PowerNow! (laptop CPUs)
- AMD PowerTune (graphics)
- Dynamic frequency scaling
- Intel SpeedStep (CPUs)
- Intel Turbo Boost
- Turbo button
