= PowerNow! =

Dynamic frequency scaling technology by AMD

AMD PowerNow!
- Design firm: Advanced Micro Devices
- Introduced: April 2000
- Discontinued: February 2017
- Type: Dynamic frequency scaling technology

AMD PowerNow! was AMD's dynamic frequency scaling and power saving technology targeted at mobile and embedded microprocessors. It allows for the core voltage and frequency to be controlled on-the-fly by the host operating system, or BIOS for embedded systems. PowerNow! was introduced with AMD's embedded processors using their K6 architecture, with the goal to combat the ever-increasing power demands and heat output with microprocessors at the time.

The technology is similar in concept to Intel's first generation SpeedStep technology. However, at the time PowerNow! was released, Intel's SpeedStep only allowed the system to step between two predefined states for core voltage and frequency (high and low). This is in contrast to AMD's implementation which allowed for up to 32 customizable settings for core voltage and frequency, with steps as small as 25 or 50 mV and 33 to 55 MHz respectively. The core frequency itself can also be controlled independently.

Though PowerNow! was originally designed with mobile and embedded systems in mind, it was adapted for use in desktop and server applications with the advent of Cool'n'Quiet and Optimized Power Management respectively. All three of these technologies aimed to complete the same goal for different segments of the market. PowerNow! as a feature was supported on AMD's server and desktop microprocessors and were not exclusive to embedded or mobile systems. It was retired and succeeded by AMD's SenseMI's Pure Power feature in 2017 with the introduction of the first generation Zen architecture.

== Processors supporting PowerNow! ==
- K6-2+
- K6-III+
- Athlon XP-M - some models.
- Mobile Athlon 64
- Mobile Sempron
- Turion 64 and X2
- Athlon II
- AMD Accelerated Processing Unit

== See also ==
- Dynamic frequency scaling

Power Saving Technologies:

- AMD Cool'n'Quiet (desktop CPUs)
- AMD PowerTune (graphics)
- Intel SpeedStep (CPUs)

Performance Boosting Technologies:

- AMD Turbo Core (CPUs)
- Intel Turbo Boost (CPUs)
