= CPU core voltage =

Voltage within a computing core

The CPU core voltage (V_{CORE}) is the power supply voltage supplied to the processing cores of CPU (which is a digital circuit), GPU, or any other device with a processing core. The amount of power a CPU uses, and thus the amount of heat it dissipates, is the product of this voltage and the current it draws. In modern CPUs, which are CMOS circuits, the current is almost proportional to the clock speed, the CPU drawing almost no current between clock cycles. (See, however, subthreshold leakage.)

== Power saving and clock speed ==
To conserve power and manage heat, many laptop and desktop processors have a power management feature that software (usually the operating system) can use to adjust the clock speed and core voltage dynamically.

Often a voltage regulator module converts power input from the power supply unit, such as a 12V one, into voltages requested by the processor.

The trend is towards lower core voltages, which conserve power. This presents the CMOS designer with a challenge, because in CMOS the voltages go only to ground and the supply voltage, the source, gate, and drain terminals of the FETs have only the supply voltage or zero voltage across them.

The MOSFET formula: $\,I_D = k((V_{GS}-V_{tn})V_{DS}-(V_{DS}/2)^2)$ says that the current $I_D$ supplied by the FET is proportional to the gate-source voltage reduced by a threshold voltage $V_{tn}$, which depends on the geometrical shape of the FET's channel and gate and their physical properties, especially capacitance. To reduce $V_{tn}$ (necessary to reduce supply voltage and increase current) one must increase capacitance. However, the load being driven is another FET gate, so the current it requires is proportional to capacitance, which thus requires the designer to keep capacitance low.

The trend towards lower supply voltage therefore works against the goal of high clock speed. Only improvements in photolithography and reduction in threshold voltage allow both to improve at once. On another note, the formula shown above is for long channel MOSFETs. With the area of the MOSFETs halving every 18–24 months (Moore's law) the distance between the two terminals of the MOSFET switch called the channel length is becoming smaller and smaller. This changes the nature of the relationship between terminal voltages and current.

Overclocking a processor increases its clock speed at the cost of system stability. Withstanding higher clock speeds often requires higher core voltage at the cost of power consumption and heat dissipation. This is called "overvolting". Overvolting generally involves running a processor out of its specifications, which may damage it or shorten CPU life.

== Dual-voltage CPU ==
A dual-voltage CPU uses a split-rail design so the processor core can use a lower voltage, while the external Input/Output (I/O) voltages remain at higher voltages for backwards compatibility.

A single-voltage CPU uses a single power voltage throughout the chip, supplying both I/O power and internal power. All CPUs before the Pentium MMX are single-voltage CPUs.

Dual-voltage CPUs were introduced for performance gain when increasing clock speeds and finer semiconductor fabrication processes caused excess heat generation and power supply concerns, especially regarding laptop computers. Using a voltage regulator, the external I/O voltage levels were transformed to lower voltages to reduce power draw, resulting in less heat for the ability to operate at higher frequencies.

VRT is a feature on older Intel P5 Pentium processors that are typically intended for use in a mobile environment. It refers to splitting the core voltage supply from the I/O voltage. A VRT processor has a 3.3 V I/O and 2.9 V core voltage, to save power compared to a typical Pentium processor with both I/O and core voltage at 3.3V. All Pentium MMX and later processors adopted this so-called split rail power supply.

== Multi-Voltage CPU ==
Besides CPU core voltage, modern CPUs often have many different voltages for components. One of the reasons behind this was that modern CPUs integrate numerous components that were once separate integrated circuits (ICs). As semiconductor technology has advanced, functions such as CPU cores, memory controllers, PCIe controllers, and, in some cases, integrated graphics, have been consolidated into a single CPU package. However, despite the overall reduction in transistor size, not all voltage requirements scale down proportionally. Some components within the CPU may still require higher voltages to operate efficiently, necessitating the use of multiple voltage levels to power various components effectively.

Some examples of different voltages in a modern CPU:

- Core Voltage (Vcore): The primary voltage supplied directly to the CPU cores
- Cache Voltage (Vcache): Some CPUs have separate voltage domains for the L2 cache.
- Uncore Voltage/System Agent Voltage (VCCSA): In some architectures, the "uncore" includes components like the L3 cache, memory controller and system agent and other interconnected components
- Input/Output Voltage (VCCIO): This voltage typically controls the CPU's input/output interfaces, including memory controllers and PCIe interfaces
- PLL (Phase-Locked Loop) Voltages: PLLs generate the frequencies used by the components in the CPU
- Integrated Graphics Voltage (VGT): CPUs with integrated graphics may have a separate voltage domain for the GPU portion

== See also ==
- Dynamic voltage scaling
- Switched-mode power supply applications (SMPS)
