= Cool'n'Quiet =

Power saving mode of modern processors by Advanced Micro Devices

AMD Cool'n'Quiet
- Design firm: Advanced Micro Devices
- Introduced: 2002
- Type: Dynamic frequency scaling

AMD Cool'n'Quiet is a CPU dynamic frequency scaling and power saving technology introduced by AMD with its Athlon XP processor line. It works by reducing the processor's clock rate and voltage when the processor is idle. The aim of this technology is to reduce overall power consumption and lower heat generation, allowing for slower (thus quieter) cooling fan operation. The objectives of cooler and quieter result in the name Cool'n'Quiet. The technology is similar to Intel's SpeedStep and AMD's own PowerNow!, which were developed with the aim of increasing laptop battery life by reducing power consumption.

Due to their different usage, Cool'n'Quiet refers to desktop and server chips, while PowerNow! is used for mobile chips; the technologies are similar but not identical. This technology was also introduced on "e-stepping" Opterons, however it is called Optimized Power Management, which is essentially a re-tooled Cool'n'Quiet scheme designed to work with registered memory.

Cool'n'Quiet is fully supported in the Linux kernel from version 2.6.18 onward (using the powernow-k8 driver) and FreeBSD from 6.0-CURRENT onward.

Since AMD Zen 2, Ryzen CPUs can support CPPC based processor power management, as well as Infinity Fabric and Core Complex level CPPC states.

== Implementation ==
In-order to take advantage of Cool'n'Quiet Technology in Microsoft's Operating Systems:

- Cool'n'Quiet should be Enabled in system BIOS
- In Windows XP and 2000: Operating Systems "Minimal Power Management" or "Portable/Laptop" profile must be active in "Power Schemes". A PPM driver was also released by AMD that facilitates this.
- In Windows Vista and 7: "Minimum processor state" found in "Processor Power Management" of "Advanced Power Settings" should be lower than "100%".

Also In Windows Vista and 7 the "Power Saver" power profile allows much lower power state (frequency and voltage) than in the "Balanced" power profile as well as the "High Performance" power profile.

Unlike Windows XP, Windows Vista only supports Cool'n'Quiet on motherboards that support ACPI 2.0 or later.

With earlier versions of Windows, processor drivers along with Cool'n'Quiet software also need to be installed. The latest version is 1.3.2.0.

In Windows 10 and Windows 11, both Power Plan in Control Panel and Power Mode in Windows Settings can affects the Cool'n'Quiet performance. For Ryzen CPUs AMD also offers an AMD power driver to optimize power management and thread scheduling.

== Processors supporting Cool'n'Quiet ==
- Athlon XP
- Athlon 64 and X2 – all models
- Athlon 64 FX – FX-53 (Socket 939 only) and higher
- FX (Socket 942)
- Athlon II – all models
- Sempron – Socket 754: 3000+ and higher; Socket AM2: 3200+ and higher
- Opteron – E-stepping and higher, branded as Optimized Power Management
- Phenom – all versions support Cool'n'Quiet 2.0
- Phenom II – supports Cool'n'Quiet 3.0
- some of the APUs
- Ryzen – 3, 5, 7, and 9 all models support Cool ‘n’ Quiet
- EPYC

== See also ==
- Dynamic frequency scaling

Power Saving Technologies:

- AMD PowerNow! (laptop CPUs)
- AMD PowerTune/AMD PowerPlay (graphics)
- AMD PowerXpress (multi-graphics)
- Intel SpeedStep (CPUs)

Performance Boosting Technologies:

- AMD Turbo Core (CPUs)
- Intel Turbo Boost (CPUs)
