= List of AMD mobile processors =

== Features overview ==
=== APUs ===
APU features table

== Initial platform (2003) ==
Launched in 2003, the initial platform for mobile AMD processors consists of:

AMD mobile	Initial platform
Mobile processor	Processors – Socket 754: Mobile Sempron single-core 32-bit processor (codenamed Dublin, Sonora, Roma), or; Mobile Athlon 64 single-core 64-bit processor (codenamed ClawHammer, Odessa, Oakville, Newark), or; Turion 64 single-core 64-bit processor (codenamed Lancaster)
Mobile chipset	D-sub and HyperTransport 1.0

=== Mobile Sempron ===
==== "Dublin" (Socket 754, CG, 130 nm, Desktop replacement) ====
MMX, SSE, SSE2, Enhanced 3DNow!, NX bit

Model number	Frequency	L2 Cache	HyperTransport	Mult.^{2}	Voltage	TDP	Release date	Part number(s)
Mobile Sempron 2600+	1600 MHz	128 kB	800 MHz	8x	0.95 – 1.4 V	13 – 62 W	July 28, 2004	SMN2600BIX2AY
Mobile Sempron 2800+	1600 MHz	256 kB	800 MHz	8x	0.95 – 1.4 V	13 – 62 W	July 28, 2004	SMN2800BIX3AY
Mobile Sempron 3000+	1800 MHz	128 kB	800 MHz	9x	0.95 – 1.4 V	13 – 62 W	July 28, 2004	SMN3000BIX2AY

==== "Dublin" (Socket 754, CG, 130 nm, Low power) ====
MMX, SSE, SSE2, Enhanced 3DNow!, NX bit

Model number	Frequency	L2 Cache	HyperTransport	Mult.^{2}	Voltage	TDP	Release date	Part number(s)
Mobile Sempron 2600+	1600 MHz	128 kB	800 MHz	8x	0.975 – 1.25 V	9 – 25 W	July 28, 2004	SMS2600BOX2LA
Mobile Sempron 2800+	1600 MHz	256 kB	800 MHz	8x	0.975 – 1.25 V	9 – 25 W	July 28, 2004	SMS2800BOX3LA

==== "Georgetown" (Socket 754, D0, 90 nm, Desktop replacement) ====
MMX, SSE, SSE2, Enhanced 3DNow!, NX bit

Model number	Frequency	L2 Cache	HyperTransport	Mult.^{2}	Voltage	TDP	Release date	Part number(s)
Mobile Sempron 2600+	1600 MHz	128 kB	800 MHz	8x	0.95 – 1.4 V	62 W	July 2004	SMN2600BIX2BA
Mobile Sempron 2800+	1600 MHz	256 kB	800 MHz	8x	0.95 – 1.4 V	62 W	July 2004	SMN2800BIX3BA
Mobile Sempron 3000+	1800 MHz	128 kB	800 MHz	9x	0.95 – 1.4 V	62 W	July 2004	SMN3000BIX2BA
Mobile Sempron 3100+	1800 MHz	256 kB	800 MHz	9x	0.95 – 1.4 V	62 W	May 3, 2005	SMN3100BIX3BA
Mobile Sempron 3300+	2000 MHz	128 kB	800 MHz	10x	0.95 – 1.4 V	62 W	August 19, 2005	SMN3300BIX2BA

==== "Sonora" (Socket 754, D0, 90 nm, Low power) ====
MMX, SSE, SSE2, Enhanced 3DNow!, NX bit

Model number	Frequency	L2 Cache	HyperTransport	Mult.^{2}	Voltage	TDP	Release date	Part number(s)
Mobile Sempron 2600+	1600 MHz	128 kB	800 MHz	8x	0.975 – 1.25 V	25 W	July 2004	SMS2600BOX2LB
Mobile Sempron 2800+	1600 MHz	256 kB	800 MHz	8x	0.975 – 1.25 V	25 W	July 2004	SMS2800BOX3LB
Mobile Sempron 3000+	1800 MHz	128 kB	800 MHz	9x	0.975 – 1.25 V	25 W	November 23, 2004	SMS3000BOX2LB
Mobile Sempron 3100+	1800 MHz	256 kB	800 MHz	9x	0.975 – 1.25 V	25 W	January 2005	SMS3100BOX3LB

==== "Albany" (Socket 754, E6, 90 nm, Desktop replacement) ====
MMX, SSE, SSE2, SSE3, Enhanced 3DNow!, NX bit

Model number	Frequency	L2 Cache	HyperTransport	Mult.^{2}	Voltage	TDP	Release date	Part number(s)
Mobile Sempron 3000+	1800 MHz	128 kB	800 MHz	9x	0.95 – 1.4 V	62 W	July 15, 2005	SMN3000BIX2BX
Mobile Sempron 3100+	1800 MHz	256 kB	800 MHz	9x	0.95 – 1.4 V	62 W	July 15, 2005	SMN3100BIX3BX
Mobile Sempron 3300+	2000 MHz	128 kB	800 MHz	10x	0.95 – 1.4 V	62 W	July 15, 2005	SMN3300BIX2BX
Mobile Sempron 3400+	2000 MHz	256 kB	800 MHz	10x	0.95 – 1.4 V	62 W	January 23, 2006	SMN3400BIX3BX
Mobile Sempron 3600+	2200 MHz	128 kB	800 MHz	11x	0.95 – 1.4 V	62 W	May 17, 2006	SMN3600BIX2BX

==== "Roma" (Socket 754, E6, 90 nm, Low power) ====
MMX, SSE, SSE2, SSE3, Enhanced 3DNow!, NX bit

Model number	Frequency	L2 Cache	HyperTransport	Mult.^{2}	Voltage	TDP	Release date	Part number(s)
Mobile Sempron 2800+	1600 MHz	256 kB	800 MHz	8x	0.95 – 1.2 V	25 W	July 15, 2005	SMS2800BQX3LF
Mobile Sempron 3000+	1800 MHz	128 kB	800 MHz	9x	0.95 – 1.2 V	25 W	July 15, 2005	SMS3000BQX2LE; SMS3000BQX2LF
Mobile Sempron 3100+	1800 MHz	256 kB	800 MHz	9x	0.95 – 1.2 V	25 W	July 15, 2005	SMS3100BQX3LE
Mobile Sempron 3300+	2000 MHz	128 kB	800 MHz	10x	0.95 – 1.2 V	25 W	July 2005	SMS3300BQX2LE
Mobile Sempron 3400+	2000 MHz	256 kB	800 MHz	10x	0.95 – 1.2 V	25 W	May 17, 2006	SMS3400BQX3LE

=== Mobile Athlon 64 ===
==== "ClawHammer" (C0 & CG, 130 nm, Desktop replacement) ====
MMX, SSE, SSE2, Enhanced 3DNow!, NX bit, AMD64 (AMD's x86-64 implementation), PowerNow!

Model number	Frequency	L2 Cache	HT	Mult.^{1}	V_{Core}	TDP	Socket	Release date	Part number(s)
Mobile Athlon 64 2700+	1600 MHz	512 kB	800 MHz	8x	1.50 V	19 – 81.5 W	Socket 754	May 2004	AMA2700BEY4AP (C0)
Mobile Athlon 64 2800+	1600 MHz	1024 kB	800 MHz	8x	1.50 V	19 – 81.5 W	Socket 754	February 2004	AMA2800BEX5AP (C0); AMA2800BEX5AR (CG)
Mobile Athlon 64 3000+	1800 MHz	1024 kB	800 MHz	9x	1.50 V	19 – 81.5 W	Socket 754	September 2003	AMA3000BEX5AP (C0); AMA3000BEX5AR (CG)
Mobile Athlon 64 3200+	2000 MHz	1024 kB	800 MHz	10x	1.50 V	19 – 81.5 W	Socket 754	September 2003	AMA3200BEX5AP (C0); AMA3200BEX5AR (CG)
Mobile Athlon 64 3400+	2200 MHz	1024 kB	800 MHz	11x	1.50 V	19 – 81.5 W	Socket 754	September 2003	AMA3400BEX5AP (C0); AMA3400BEX5AR (CG)
Mobile Athlon 64 3700+	2400 MHz	1024 kB	800 MHz	12x	1.50 V	19 – 81.5 W	Socket 754	September 2003	AMA3700BEX5AP (C0); AMA3700BEX5AR (CG)

==== "ClawHammer" (C0 & CG, 130 nm, 62 W TDP) ====
MMX, SSE, SSE2, Enhanced 3DNow!, NX bit, AMD64 (AMD's x86-64 implementation), PowerNow!

Model number	Frequency	L2 Cache	HT	Mult.^{1}	V_{Core}	TDP	Socket	Release date	Part number(s)
Mobile Athlon 64 2800+	1600 MHz	1024 kB	800 MHz	8x	1.40 V	62 W	Socket 754	September 2003	AMN2800BIX5AP (C0); AMN2800BIX5AR (CG)
Mobile Athlon 64 3000+	1800 MHz	1024 kB	800 MHz	9x	1.40 V	62 W	Socket 754	September 2003	AMN3000BIX5AP (C0); AMN3000BIX5AR (CG)
Mobile Athlon 64 3200+	2000 MHz	1024 kB	800 MHz	10x	1.40 V	62 W	Socket 754	September 2003	AMN3200BIX5AP (C0); AMN3200BIX5AR (CG)
Mobile Athlon 64 3400+	2200 MHz	1024 kB	800 MHz	11x	1.40 V	62 W	Socket 754	February 2004	AMN3400BIX5AR (CG)

==== "ClawHammer" (CG, 130 nm, 35 W TDP) ====
MMX, SSE, SSE2, Enhanced 3DNow!, NX bit, AMD64 (AMD's x86-64 implementation), PowerNow!

Model number	Frequency	L2 Cache	HT	Mult.^{1}	V_{Core}	TDP	Socket	Release date	Part number(s)
Mobile Athlon 64 2700+	1600 MHz	512 kB	800 MHz	8x	1.20 V	35 W	Socket 754	May 2004	AMD2700BQX4AR

==== "Odessa" (CG, 130 nm, Desktop replacement) ====
MMX, SSE, SSE2, Enhanced 3DNow!, NX bit, AMD64 (AMD's x86-64 implementation), PowerNow!

Model number	Frequency	L2 Cache	HT	Mult.^{1}	V_{Core}	TDP	Socket	Release date	Part number(s)
Mobile Athlon 64 2800+	1800 MHz	512 kB	800 MHz	8x	1.50 V	19 – 81.5 W	Socket 754	April 2004	AMA2800BEX4AX

==== "Odessa" (CG, 130 nm, 35 W TDP) ====
MMX, SSE, SSE2, Enhanced 3DNow!, NX bit, AMD64 (AMD's x86-64 implementation), PowerNow!

Model number	Frequency	L2 Cache	HT	Mult.^{1}	V_{Core}	TDP	Socket	Release date	Part number(s)
Mobile Athlon 64 2700+	1600 MHz	512 kB	800 MHz	8×	1.20 V	35 W	Socket 754	May 2004	AMD2700BQX4AX
Mobile Athlon 64 2800+	1800 MHz	512 kB	800 MHz	9×	1.20 V	35 W	Socket 754	May 2004	AMD2800BQX4AX
Mobile Athlon 64 3000+	2000 MHz	512 kB	800 MHz	10×	1.20 V	35 W	Socket 754	May 2004	AMD3000BQX4AX

==== "Oakville" (D0, 90 nm, 35 W TDP Low Power) ====
MMX, SSE, SSE2, Enhanced 3DNow!, NX bit, AMD64 (AMD's x86-64 implementation), PowerNow!

Model number	Frequency	L2 Cache	HT	Mult.^{1}	V_{Core}	TDP	Socket	Release date	Part number(s)
Mobile Athlon 64 2700+	1600 MHz	512 kB	800 MHz	8×	1.35 V	35 W	Socket 754	August 17, 2004	AMD2700BKX4LB
Mobile Athlon 64 2800+	1800 MHz	512 kB	800 MHz	9×	1.35 V	35 W	Socket 754	August 17, 2004	AMD2800BKX4LB
Mobile Athlon 64 3000+	2000 MHz	512 kB	800 MHz	10×	1.35 V	35 W	Socket 754	August 17, 2004	AMD3000BKX4LB

==== "Newark" (E5, 90 nm, 62 W TDP) ====
MMX, SSE, SSE2, SSE3, Enhanced 3DNow!, NX bit, AMD64 (AMD's x86-64 implementation), PowerNow!

Model number	Frequency	L2 Cache	HT	Mult.^{1}	V_{Core}	TDP	Socket	Release date	Part number(s)
Mobile Athlon 64 3000+	1800 MHz	1024 kB	800 MHz	9×	1.35 V	62 W	Socket 754	April 14, 2005	AMN3000BKX5BU
Mobile Athlon 64 3200+	2000 MHz	1024 kB	800 MHz	10×	1.35 V	62 W	Socket 754	April 14, 2005	AMN3200BKX5BU
Mobile Athlon 64 3400+	2200 MHz	1024 kB	800 MHz	11×	1.35 V	62 W	Socket 754	April 14, 2005	AMN3400BKX5BU
Mobile Athlon 64 3700+	2400 MHz	1024 kB	800 MHz	12×	1.35 V	62 W	Socket 754	April 14, 2005	AMN3700BKX5BU
Mobile Athlon 64 4000+	2600 MHz	1024 kB	800 MHz	13×	1.35 V	62 W	Socket 754	August 16, 2005	AMN4000BKX5BU

=== Turion 64 ===
==== "Lancaster" (90 nm) ====
MMX, SSE, SSE2, SSE3, Enhanced 3DNow!, NX bit, AMD64, PowerNow!

Model number	Frequency	L2 Cache	HT	Mult.^{1}	Voltage	TDP	Socket	Release date	Order part number
Turion 64 ML-28	1600 MHz	512 kB	800 MHz	8x	1.35 V	35 W	Socket 754	June 22, 2005	TMDML28BKX4LD
Turion 64 ML-30	1600 MHz	1024 kB	800 MHz	8x	1.35 V	35 W	Socket 754	March 10, 2005	TMDML30BKX5LD
Turion 64 ML-32	1800 MHz	512 kB	800 MHz	9x	1.35 V	35 W	Socket 754	March 10, 2005	TMDML32BKX4LD
Turion 64 ML-34	1800 MHz	1024 kB	800 MHz	9x	1.35 V	35 W	Socket 754	March 10, 2005	TMDML34BKX5LD
Turion 64 ML-37	2000 MHz	1024 kB	800 MHz	10x	1.35 V	35 W	Socket 754	March 10, 2005	TMDML37BKX5LD
Turion 64 ML-40	2200 MHz	1024 kB	800 MHz	11x	1.35 V	35 W	Socket 754	June 22, 2005	TMDML40BKX5LD
Turion 64 ML-42	2400 MHz	512 kB	800 MHz	12x	1.35 V	35 W	Socket 754	October 4, 2005	TMDML42BKX4LD
Turion 64 ML-44	2400 MHz	1024 kB	800 MHz	12x	1.35 V	35 W	Socket 754	January 4, 2006	TMDML44BKX5LD
Turion 64 MT-28	1600 MHz	512 kB	800 MHz	8x	1.20 V	25 W	Socket 754	June 22, 2005	TMSMT28BQX4LD
Turion 64 MT-30	1600 MHz	1024 kB	800 MHz	8x	1.20 V	25 W	Socket 754	March 10, 2005	TMSMT30BQX5LD
Turion 64 MT-32	1800 MHz	512 kB	800 MHz	9x	1.20 V	25 W	Socket 754	March 10, 2005	TMSMT32BQX4LD
Turion 64 MT-34	1800 MHz	1024 kB	800 MHz	9x	1.20 V	25 W	Socket 754	March 10, 2005	TMSMT34BQX5LD
Turion 64 MT-37	2000 MHz	1024 kB	800 MHz	10x	1.20 V	25 W	Socket 754	August 8, 2005	TMSMT37BQX5LD
Turion 64 MT-40	2200 MHz	1024 kB	800 MHz	11x	1.20 V	25 W	Socket 754	August 8, 2005	TMSMT40BQX5LD

== Kite platform (2006) ==
Introduced in 2006, the Kite platform consists of:

AMD mobile	Kite platform
Mobile processor	Processors – Socket S1: Mobile Sempron single-core 64-bit processor (codenamed Keene), or; Turion 64 single-core 64-bit processor (codenamed Richmond), or; Turion 64 X2 dual-core 64-bit processor (codenamed Taylor, Trinidad)
Mobile chipset	DVI and HyperTransport 1.0; DDR2-667 SO-DIMM
Mobile support	Wireless IEEE 802.11 b/g mini-PCI Express WiFi adapter

=== Mobile Sempron ===
==== "Keene" (Socket S1, F2, 90 nm, Low power) ====
MMX, SSE, SSE2, SSE3, Enhanced 3DNow!, NX bit, AMD64, PowerNow!

Model number	Frequency	L2 Cache	HyperTransport	Mult.^{2}	Voltage	TDP	Release date	Part number(s)
Mobile Sempron 3200+	1600 MHz	512 kB	800 MHz	8x	0.950 – 1.125 V	25 W	May 17, 2006	SMS3200HAX4CM
Mobile Sempron 3400+	1800 MHz	256 kB	800 MHz	9x	0.950 – 1.125 V	25 W	May 17, 2006	SMS3400HAX3CM
Mobile Sempron 3500+	1800 MHz	512 kB	800 MHz	9x	0.950 – 1.125 V	25 W	May 17, 2006	SMS3500HAX4CM
Mobile Sempron 3600+	2000 MHz	256 kB	800 MHz	10x	0.950 – 1.125 V	25 W	Oct 23, 2006	SMS3600HAX3CM

=== Turion 64 ===
==== "Richmond" (90 nm) ====
MMX, SSE, SSE2, SSE3, Enhanced 3DNow!, NX bit, AMD64, PowerNow!, AMD-V

Model number	Frequency	L2 Cache	HT	Mult.^{1}	Voltage	TDP	Socket	Release date	Order part number
Turion 64 MK-36	2000 MHz	512 kB	800 MHz	10x	1.15 V	31 W	Socket S1	September 1, 2006	TMDMK36HAX4CM
Turion 64 MK-38	2200 MHz	512 kB	800 MHz	11x	1.15 V	31 W	Socket S1	Q1 2007	TMDMK38HAX4CM

=== Turion 64 X2 ===
==== "Taylor" (90 nm) ====
MMX, SSE, SSE2, SSE3, Enhanced 3DNow!, NX bit, AMD64, PowerNow!, AMD-V

Model number	Frequency	L2 Cache	HT	Mult.^{1}	Voltage	TDP	Socket	Release date	Order part number
Turion 64 X2 TL-50	1600 MHz	2 × 256 kB	800 MHz	8x	0.8 – 1.10 V	31 W	Socket S1	May 17, 2006	TMDTL50HAX4CT

==== "Trinidad" (90 nm) ====
MMX, SSE, SSE2, SSE3, Enhanced 3DNow!, NX bit, AMD64, PowerNow!, AMD-V

Model number	Frequency	L2 Cache	HT	Mult.^{1}	Voltage	TDP	Socket	Release date	Order part number
Turion 64 X2 TL-52	1600 MHz	2 × 512 kB	800 MHz	8x	0.8 – 1.125 V	31 W	Socket S1	May 17, 2006	TMDTL52HAX5CT
Turion 64 X2 TL-56	1800 MHz	2 × 512 kB	800 MHz	9x	0.8 – 1.125 V	33 W	Socket S1	May 17, 2006	TMDTL56HAX5CT
Turion 64 X2 TL-60	2000 MHz	2 × 512 kB	800 MHz	10x	0.8 – 1.125 V	35 W	Socket S1	May 17, 2006	TMDTL60HAX5CT
Turion 64 X2 TL-64	2200 MHz	2 × 512 kB	800 MHz	11x	0.8 – 1.125 V	35 W	Socket S1	January 30, 2007	TMDTL64HAX5CT

== Kite Refresh platform (2007) ==
AMD used Kite Refresh as the codenamed for the second-generation AMD mobile platform introduced in February 2007.

AMD mobile	Kite Refresh platform
Mobile processor	Processors – Socket S1: Turion 64 X2 dual-core 64-bit Hawk family processor 65 nm (codenamed Tyler), or; Mobile Sempron single-core 64-bit processor 65 nm (codenamed Sherman)
Mobile chipset	HDMI, HyperTransport 1.0 and PCI Express 1.0; DDR2-800 SO-DIMM
Mobile support	Wireless IEEE 802.11 a/b/g/draft-N support, mini-PCIe Wi-Fi adapter; Hybrid hard drives; Alert Standard Format (ASF) 2.0 (ASF page); Trusted Platform Module (TPM)

=== Mobile Sempron ===
==== "Sherman" (Socket S1, G1 & G2, 65 nm, Low power) ====
MMX, SSE, SSE2, SSE3, Enhanced 3DNow!, NX bit, AMD64

Model number	Frequency	L2 Cache	HyperTransport	Mult.^{2}	Voltage	TDP	Release date	Part number(s)
Sempron 2100+ fanless	1000 MHz	256 kB	800 MHz	5x	0.950 – 1.125 V	9 W	May 30, 2007	SMF2100HAX3DQE (G1)
Mobile Sempron 3600+	2000 MHz	256 kB	800 MHz	10x		25 W		SMS3600HAX3DN (G2)
Mobile Sempron 3700+	2000 MHz	512 kB	800 MHz	10x		25 W		SMS3700HAX4DQE (G1)
Mobile Sempron 3800+	2200 MHz	256 kB	800 MHz	11x		31 W		SMD3800HAX3DN (G2)
Mobile Sempron 4000+	2200 MHz	512 kB	800 MHz	11x		31 W		SMD4000HAX4DN (G2)

=== Athlon 64 X2 ===
==== "Tyler" (65 nm) ====
MMX, SSE, SSE2, SSE3, Enhanced 3DNow!, NX bit, AMD64, PowerNow!, AMD-V

Model number	Frequency	L2 Cache	HT	Mult.^{1}	Voltage	TDP	Socket	Release date	Order part number
Athlon 64 X2 TK-42	1600 MHz	2 × 512 kB	800 MHz	8.0x	1.075/1.10/1.125 V	20 W	Socket S1		AMETK42HAX5DM
Athlon 64 X2 TK-53	1700 MHz	2 × 256 kB	800 MHz	8.5x	1.075/1.10/1.125 V	31 W	Socket S1	August 20, 2007	AMDTK53HAX4DC
Athlon 64 X2 TK-55	1800 MHz	2 × 256 kB	800 MHz	9.0x	1.075/1.10/1.125 V	31 W	Socket S1	Aug 20 2007	AMDTK55HAX4DC
Athlon 64 X2 TK-57	1900 MHz	2 × 256 kB	800 MHz	9.5x	1.075/1.10/1.125 V	31 W	Socket S1	2008	AMDTK57HAX4DM

=== Turion 64 X2 ===
==== "Tyler" (65 nm) ====
MMX, SSE, SSE2, SSE3, Enhanced 3DNow!, NX bit, AMD64, PowerNow!, AMD-V

Model number	Frequency	L2 Cache	HT	Mult.^{1}	Voltage	TDP	Socket	Release date	Order part number
Turion 64 X2 TL-56	1800 MHz	2 × 512 kB	800 MHz	9.0x	1.075/1.10/1.125 V	31 W	Socket S1	May 7, 2007	TMDTL56HAX5DC
Turion 64 X2 TL-58	1900 MHz	2 × 512 kB	800 MHz	9.5x	1.075/1.10/1.125 V	31 W	Socket S1	May 7, 2007	TMDTL58HAX5DC
Turion 64 X2 TL-60	2000 MHz	2 × 512 kB	800 MHz	10.0x	1.075/1.10/1.125 V	31 W	Socket S1	May 7, 2007	TMDTL60HAX5DC
Turion 64 X2 TL-62	2100 MHz	2 × 512 kB	800 MHz	10.5x	1.075/1.10/1.125 V	35 W	Socket S1	Jan 21 2008	TMDTL62HAX5DM
Turion 64 X2 TL-64	2200 MHz	2 × 512 kB	800 MHz	11.0x	1.075/1.10/1.125 V	35 W	Socket S1	May 7, 2007	TMDTL64HAX5DC
Turion 64 X2 TL-66	2300 MHz	2 × 512 kB	800 MHz	11.5x	1.075/1.10/1.125 V	35 W	Socket S1	May 7, 2007; Jul 10 2007	TMDTL66HAX5DC; TMDTL66HAX5DM
Turion 64 X2 TL-68	2400 MHz	2 × 512 kB	800 MHz	12.0x	1.075/1.10/1.125 V	35 W	Socket S1	December 19, 2007	TMDTL68HAX5DM

== Puma platform (2008) ==
The Puma platform introduced in 2008 with June 2008 availability for the third-generation AMD mobile platform consists of:

AMD mobile	Initial platform
Mobile processor	Processors: Dual-core 64-bit codenamed Griffin of processors, named "Turion X2 Ultra", or; Mobile Sempron single-core 64-bit processor (codenamed Sable), with the following: Split-power planes and linked power management support; Support for possible low voltage processors
Mobile chipset	AMD M780 series chipset: Mobility Radeon HD 3000 series GPU on 55 nm process; ATI Hybrid Graphics; Hybrid CrossFire; PowerXpress; HyperFlash – memory modules on motherboard with ReadyBoost; DisplayPort, HyperTransport 3.0 and PCI Express 2.0 support; DDR2-800 SO-DIMM
Mobile support	Wireless IEEE 802.11 a/b/g/n mini-PCIe Wi-Fi adapter; Hybrid hard drives; Desktop and mobile Architecture for System Hardware (DASH) 1.0 support (DASH page); Trusted Platform Module (TPM) support

=== Mobile Sempron ===
==== "Sable" (65 nm) ====
MMX, SSE, SSE2, SSE3, Enhanced 3DNow!, NX bit, AMD64, PowerNow!

Model number	Frequency	L2 Cache	HT	Mult.^{1}	Voltage	TDP	Socket	Release date	Order part number
Sempron SI-40	2000 MHz	512 kB	1800 MHz	10.0x	1.075 – 1.125 V	25 W	Socket S1G2	June 4, 2008	SMSI40SAM12GG
Sempron SI-42	2100 MHz	512 kB	1800 MHz	10.5x	1.075 – 1.125 V	25 W	Socket S1G2	Q3 2008	SMSI42SAM12GG

=== Athlon X2 ===
==== "Lion" (65 nm) ====
MMX, SSE, SSE2, SSE3, Enhanced 3DNow!, NX bit, AMD64, PowerNow!, AMD-V

Model number	Frequency	L2 Cache	HT	Mult.^{1}	Voltage	TDP	Socket	Release date	Order part number
Athlon X2 QL-60	1900 MHz	2 × 512 kB	1800 MHz	9.5x	0.95 – 1.1 V	35 W	Socket S1G2	June 4, 2008	AMQL60DAM22GG
Athlon X2 QL-62	2000 MHz	2 × 512 kB	1800 MHz	10.0x	0.95 – 1.1 V	35 W	Socket S1G2	Q3 2008	AMQL62DAM22GG
Athlon X2 QL-64	2100 MHz	2 × 512 kB	1800 MHz	10.5x	0.95 – 1.1 V	35 W	Socket S1G2	Q4 2008	AMQL64DAM22GG
Athlon X2 QL-65	2100 MHz	2 × 512 kB	2000 MHz	10.5x	0.95 – 1.1 V	35 W	Socket S1G2	Q4 2008	AMQL65DAM22GG
Athlon X2 QL-66	2200 MHz	2 × 512 kB	1800 MHz	11.0x	0.95 – 1.1 V	35 W	Socket S1G2	Q4 2008	AMQL66DAM22GG
Athlon X2 QL-67	2200 MHz	2 × 512 kB	2000 MHz	11.0x	0.95 – 1.1 V	35 W	Socket S1G2	Q4 2008	AMQL67DAM22GG

=== Turion X2 ===
==== "Lion" (65 nm) ====
MMX, SSE, SSE2, SSE3, Enhanced 3DNow!, NX bit, AMD64, PowerNow!, AMD-V

Model number	Frequency	L2 Cache	HT	Mult.^{1}	Voltage	TDP	Socket	Release date	Order part number
Turion X2 RM-70	2000 MHz	2 × 512 kB	1800 MHz	10x	0.75 – 1.2 V	31 W	Socket S1G2	June 4, 2008	TMRM70DAM22GG
Turion X2 RM-72	2100 MHz	2 × 512 kB	1800 MHz	10.5x	0.75 – 1.2 V	35 W	Socket S1G2	Q3 2008	TMRM72DAM22GG
Turion X2 RM-74	2200 MHz	2 × 512 kB	1800 MHz	11.0x	0.75 – 1.2 V	35 W	Socket S1G2	Q4 2008	TMRM74DAM22GG
Turion X2 RM-75	2200 MHz	2 × 512 kB	2000 MHz	11.0x	0.75 – 1.2 V	35 W	Socket S1G2	Q4 2008	TMRM75DAM22GG
Turion X2 RM-76	2300 MHz	2 × 512 kB	1800 MHz	11.5x	0.75 – 1.2 V	35 W	Socket S1G2	Q4 2008	TMRM76DAM22GG
Turion X2 RM-77	2300 MHz	2 × 512 kB	2000 MHz	11.5x	0.75 – 1.2 V	35 W	Socket S1G2	Q4 2008	TMRM77DAM22GG

=== Turion X2 Ultra ===
==== "Lion" (65 nm) ====
MMX, SSE, SSE2, SSE3, Enhanced 3DNow!, NX bit, AMD64, PowerNow!, AMD-V

Model number	Frequency	L2 Cache	HT	Mult.^{1}	Voltage	TDP	Socket	Release date	Order part number
Turion X2 Ultra ZM-80	2100 MHz	2 × 1 MB	1800 MHz	10.5x	0.75 – 1.2 V	32 W	Socket S1G2	June 4, 2008	TMZM80DAM23GG
Turion X2 Ultra ZM-82	2200 MHz	2 × 1 MB	1800 MHz	11.0x	0.75 – 1.2 V	35 W	Socket S1G2	June 4, 2008	TMZM82DAM23GG
Turion X2 Ultra ZM-84	2300 MHz	2 × 1 MB	1800 MHz	11.5x	0.75 – 1.2 V	35 W	Socket S1G2	Q3 2008	TMZM84DAM23GG
Turion X2 Ultra ZM-85	2300 MHz	2 × 1 MB	2200 MHz	11.5x	0.75 – 1.2 V	35 W	Socket S1G2	Q3 2008	TMZM85DAM23GG
Turion X2 Ultra ZM-86	2400 MHz	2 × 1 MB	1800 MHz	12.0x	0.75 – 1.2 V	35 W	Socket S1G2	June 4, 2008	TMZM86DAM23GG
Turion X2 Ultra ZM-87	2400 MHz	2 × 1 MB	2200 MHz	12.0x	0.75 – 1.2 V	35 W	Socket S1G2	Q3 2008	TMZM87DAM23GG
Turion X2 Ultra ZM-88	2500 MHz	2 × 1 MB	1800 MHz	12.5x	0.75 – 1.2 V	35 W	Socket S1G2	Q3 2008	TMZM88DAM23GG

== Yukon platform (2009) ==
The Yukon platform was introduced on January 8, 2009, with expected April availability for the first AMD Ultrathin Platform targeting the ultra-portable notebook market.

AMD mobile	Initial platform
Mobile processor	Processors: Single-core 64-bit codenamed Huron of processors, named "Athlon Neo", or; Mobile Sempron single-core 64-bit processor (codenamed Huron), with the following: 27 mm (W) × 27 mm (D) × 2.5 mm (H) BGA package, named "ASB1"; low voltage processors
Mobile chipset	AMD RS690E series chipset + SB600 southbridge: Mobility Radeon HD 3000 series GPU on 55 nm process (as option); DDR2 SO-DIMM
Mobile support	Wireless connectivity with 3G (as option); Wireless IEEE 802.11 a/b/g/n mini-PCIe Wi-Fi adapter

=== Sempron ===
==== "Huron" (65 nm, Low power) ====
- Both models support: MMX, SSE, SSE2, SSE3, Enhanced 3DNow!, NX bit, AMD64
- Sempron 210U supports extra AMD-V

Model number	Frequency	L2 Cache	HT	Mult.^{1}	Voltage	TDP	Package/Socket	Release date	Order part number
Sempron 200U	1000 MHz	256 kB	1600 MHz	5x	0.925 V	8 W	Socket ASB1	January 8, 2009	SMF200UOAX3DV
Sempron 210U	1500 MHz	256 kB	1600 MHz	7.5x	0.925 V	15 W	Socket ASB1	January 8, 2009	SMG210UOAX3DX

=== Athlon Neo ===
==== "Huron" (65 nm, 15 W TDP) ====
MMX, SSE, SSE2, SSE3, Enhanced 3DNow!, NX bit, AMD64 (AMD's x86-64 implementation), PowerNow!, AMD-V

Model number	Frequency	L2 Cache	HT	Mult.^{1}	V_{Core}	TDP	Package	Release date	Part number(s)
Athlon Neo MV-40	1600 MHz	512 kB	800 MHz	8x	1.1 V	15 W	Socket ASB1	January 8, 2009	AMGMV40OAX4DX

==== "Sherman" (65 nm, 15 W TDP) ====
MMX, SSE, SSE2, SSE3, Enhanced 3DNow!, NX bit, AMD64 (AMD's x86-64 implementation), PowerNow!

Model number	Frequency	L2 Cache	HT	Mult.^{1}	V_{Core}	TDP	Package	Release date	Part number(s)
Athlon Neo TF-20	1600 MHz	512 kB	800 MHz	8x	1.0 V	15 W	Socket S1	January 8, 2009	AMGTF20HAX4DN

==== "Congo" (65 nm, 13 W TDP) ====
MMX, SSE, SSE2, SSE3, Enhanced 3DNow!, NX bit, AMD64 (AMD's x86-64 implementation), PowerNow!

Model number	Frequency	L2 Cache	HT	Mult.^{1}	V_{Core}	TDP	Package	Release date	Part number(s)
Athlon Mobile X2 L310	1200 MHz	2 × 512 kB	800 MHz	6x	0.925 V	13 W	Socket S1	January 8, 2009	AMML310HAX5DM

=== Turion ===
==== "Congo" (65 nm, 20 W TDP) ====
MMX, SSE, SSE2, SSE3, Enhanced 3DNow!, NX bit, AMD64 (AMD's x86-64 implementation), PowerNow!

Model number	Frequency	L2 Cache	HT	Mult.^{1}	V_{Core}	TDP	Package	Release date	Part number(s)
Turion Mobile X2 L510	1600 MHz	2 × 512 kB	800 MHz	8x	0.925 V	20 W	Socket S1	January 8, 2009	TMEL510HAX5DM

== Congo platform (2009) ==
The Congo platform was introduced in September 2009, as the second AMD Ultrathin Platform targeting the ultra-portable notebook market.

AMD mobile	Initial platform
Mobile processor	Processors: Single or Dual-core 64-bit processors codenamed Conesus, with the following: made on 65 nm process; 15 W (single-core) or 18 W (dual-core) TDP; 27 mm (W) × 27 mm (D) × 2.5 mm (H) BGA package, named "ASB1"; low voltage processors; DDR2 SO-DIMM
Mobile chipset	AMD M780G(RS780M) series chipset + SB710 southbridge: Mobility Radeon HD 3200 GPU on 55 nm process (as option); RV610 graphics core; DirectX 10.0; UVD

=== Athlon Neo X2 ===
==== "Conesus" (65 nm) ====
MMX, SSE, SSE2, SSE3, Enhanced 3DNow!, NX bit, AMD64, AMD-V

Model number	Frequency	L2 Cache	HT	Mult.^{1}	Voltage	TDP	Socket	Release date	Order part number
Athlon Neo X2 L325	1500 MHz	2 × 512 kB	800 MHz	7.5x	0.925 V	18 W	Socket ASB1	August 10, 2009	AMZL325OAX5DY
Athlon Neo X2 L335	1600 MHz	2 × 512 kB	800 MHz	8.0x	0.925 V	18 W	Socket ASB1	February 2010	AMZL335OAX5DY

=== Turion Neo X2 ===
==== "Conesus" (65 nm) ====
MMX, SSE, SSE2, SSE3, Enhanced 3DNow!, NX bit, AMD64, AMD-V, PowerNow!

Model number	Frequency	L2 Cache	HT	Mult.^{1}	Voltage	TDP	Socket	Release date	Order part number
Turion Neo X2 L625	1600 MHz	2 × 512 kB	800 MHz	8x	0.925 V	18 W	Socket ASB1	August 10, 2009	TMZL625OAX5DY

== Tigris platform (2009) ==
The Tigris platform introduced in September 2009 for the AMD Mainstream Notebook Platform consists of:

AMD mobile	Initial platform
Mobile processor	Processors: Single or Dual-core 64-bit processors codenamed Caspian, with the following: made on 45 nm process; 25 W (single-core) or 35 W (dual-core) TDP
Mobile chipset	AMD M785(RS880M) series chipset + SB710 southbridge: Mobility Radeon HD 4200 GPU on 55 nm process; RV620 graphics core; DirectX 10.1; UVD 2

=== Sempron ===
==== "Caspian" (45 nm) ====
Single-core mobile processor

MMX, SSE, SSE2, SSE3, SSE4a, ABM, Enhanced 3DNow!, NX bit, AMD64, PowerNow!, AMD-V

Model Number	Frequency	L2 Cache	FPU width	HT	Mult.	Voltage	TDP	Socket	Release date	Order Part Number
Sempron M100	2000 MHz	512 kB	64-bit	1600 MHz	10.0x		25 W	Socket S1G3	September 10, 2009	SMM100SBO12GQ
Sempron M120	2100 MHz	512 kB	64-bit	1600 MHz	10.5x		25 W	Socket S1G3	September 10, 2009	SMM120SBO12GQ
Sempron M140	2200 MHz	512 kB	64-bit	1600 MHz	10.5x		25 W	Socket S1G3	April 2010	SMM140SBO12GQ

=== Athlon II ===
==== "Caspian" (45 nm) ====
Dual-core mobile processor

MMX, SSE, SSE2, SSE3, SSE4a, ABM, Enhanced 3DNow!, NX bit, AMD64, PowerNow!, AMD-V

Model number	Frequency	L2 cache	FPU width	HT	Mult.	TDP	Socket	Release date	Part number
Athlon II M300	2.0 GHz	2 × 512 kB	64-bit	1.6 GHz	10×	35 W	Socket S1G3	September 10, 2009	AMM300DBO22GQ
Athlon II M320	2.1 GHz	2 × 512 kB	64-bit	1.6 GHz	10.5×	35 W	Socket S1G3	September 10, 2009	AMM320DBO22GQ
Athlon II M340	2.2 GHz	2 × 512 kB	64-bit	1.6 GHz	11×	35 W	Socket S1G3	September 10, 2009	AMM340DBO22GQ
Athlon II M360	2.3 GHz	2 × 512 kB	64-bit	1.6 GHz	11×	35 W	Socket S1G3	May 2010	AMM360DBO22GQ

=== Turion II ===
==== "Caspian" (45 nm) ====
Dual-core mobile processor

MMX, SSE, SSE2, SSE3, SSE4a, ABM, Enhanced 3DNow!, NX bit, AMD64, PowerNow!, AMD-V

Model number	Clock speed	L2 cache	FPU width	Hyper Transport	Multi	TDP	Socket	Release date	Part number
Turion II M500	2.2 GHz	2 × 512 KB	128-bit	1.8 GHz	11×	35 W	Socket S1G3	September 10, 2009	TMM500DBO22GQ
Turion II M520	2.3 GHz	2 × 512 KB	128-bit	1.8 GHz	11.5×	35 W	Socket S1G3	September 10, 2009	TMM520DBO22GQ
Turion II M540	2.4 GHz	2 × 512 KB	128-bit	1.8 GHz	12×	35 W	Socket S1G3	September 10, 2009	TMM540DBO22GQ
Turion II M560	2.5 GHz	2 × 512 KB	128-bit	1.8 GHz	12×	35 W	Socket S1G3	April 2010	TMM560DBO22GQ

=== Turion II (Ultra) ===
==== "Caspian" (45 nm) ====
Dual-core mobile processor

MMX, SSE, SSE2, SSE3, SSE4a, ABM, Enhanced 3DNow!, NX bit, AMD64, PowerNow!, AMD-V

Model number	Clock speed	L2 cache	FPU width	Hyper Transport	Multi	TDP	Socket	Release date	Part number
Turion II Ultra M600	2.4 GHz	2 × 1 MB	128-bit	1.8 GHz	12×	35 W	Socket S1G3	September 10, 2009	TMM600DBO23GQ
Turion II Ultra M620	2.5 GHz	2 × 1 MB	128-bit	1.8 GHz	12.5×	35 W	Socket S1G3	September 10, 2009	TMM620DBO23GQ
Turion II Ultra M640	2.6 GHz	2 × 1 MB	128-bit	1.8 GHz	13×	35 W	Socket S1G3	September 10, 2009	TMM640DBO23GQ
Turion II Ultra M660	2.7 GHz	2 × 1 MB	128-bit	1.8 GHz	13.5×	35 W	Socket S1G3	September 10, 2009	TMM660DBO23GQ

== Nile platform (2010) ==
The Nile platform introduced on May 12, 2010, for the third AMD Ultrathin Platform consists of:

AMD mobile	Initial platform
Mobile processor	Processors: Single or Dual-core 64-bit processors codenamed Geneva, with the following: made on 45 nm process; support for DDR3 memory; 9 W, 12 W or 15 W TDP
Mobile chipset	AMD RS880 series chipset + SB850 southbridge: Mobility Radeon HD 42xx GPU on 55 nm process; RV620 graphics core; DirectX 10.1; UVD 2

- MMX, SSE, SSE2, SSE3, SSE4a, ABM, Enhanced 3DNow!, NX bit, AMD64, PowerNow!, AMD-V
- Memory support: DDR3 SDRAM, DDR3L SDRAM (Up to 1066)

=== V series ===
==== "Geneva" (45 nm) ====
Single-core mobile processor

Model number	Clock speed	L2 cache	FPU width	Hyper Transport	Multi	TDP	Socket	Release date	Part number
V105	1.2 GHz	512 KB	64-bit	1.0 GHz	6×	9 W	ASB2	May 12, 2010	VMV105FDV12GM

=== Athlon II Neo ===
==== "Geneva" (45 nm) ====
Single-core mobile processor Single-core mobile processor

Model number	Frequency	L2 Cache	FPU width	HT	Mult.	TDP	Socket	Release date	Order Part Number
Athlon II Neo K125	1.7 GHz	1 MB	64-bit	1.0 GHz	8.5×	12 W	ASB2	May 12, 2010	AMK125LAV13GM
Athlon II Neo K145	1.8 GHz	1 MB	64-bit	1.0 GHz	9×	12 W	ASB2	January 4, 2011	AMK145LAV13GM

Dual-core mobile processor

Model number	Frequency	L2 Cache	FPU width	HT	Mult.	TDP	Socket	Release date	Order Part Number
Athlon II Neo N36L	1.3 GHz	2 × 1 MB	64-bit	1.0 GHz	6.5×	12 W	ASB2	April 26, 2010	AEN36LLAV23GME
Athlon II Neo K325	1.3 GHz	2 × 1 MB	64-bit	1.0 GHz	6.5×	12 W	ASB2	May 12, 2010	AMK325LAV23GM
Athlon II Neo K345	1.4 GHz	2 × 1 MB	64-bit	1.0 GHz	7×	12 W	ASB2	January 4, 2011	AMK345LAV23GM

=== Turion II Neo ===
==== "Geneva" (45 nm) ====
Dual-core mobile processor

Model number	Clock speed	L2 cache	FPU width	Hyper Transport	Multi	TDP	Socket	Release date	Part number
Turion II Neo N40L	1.5 GHz	2 × 1 MB	128-bit	1.6 GHz	7.5×	15 W	Socket ASB2	April 26, 2010	TEN40LGAV23GME
Turion II K625	1.5 GHz	2 × 1 MB	128-bit	1.6 GHz	7.5×	15 W	Socket ASB2	May 12, 2010	TMK625GAV23GM
Turion II K645	1.6 GHz	2 × 1 MB	128-bit	1.6 GHz	8×	15 W	Socket ASB2	January 4, 2011	TMK645GAV23GM
Turion II K665	1.7 GHz	2 × 1 MB	128-bit	1.6 GHz	8.5×	15 W	Socket ASB2	May 12, 2010	TMK665GAV23GM
Turion II K685	1.8 GHz	2 × 1 MB	128-bit	1.6 GHz	9×	15 W	Socket ASB2	January 4, 2011	TMK685GAV23GM
Turion II Neo N54L	2.2 GHz	2 × 1 MB	128-bit	1.6 GHz	11×	25 W	Socket ASB2	May 2010	TEN54LSDV23GME

== Danube platform (2010) ==
The Danube platform introduced on May 12, 2010, for the AMD Mainstream Notebook Platform consists of:

AMD mobile	Initial platform
Mobile processor	Processors: Single, Dual, Triple or Quad-core 64-bit processors codenamed Champlain, with the following: made on 45 nm process; support for DDR3 memory; 25, 35 or 45 W TDP
Mobile chipset	AMD RS880 series chipset + SB850 southbridge: Mobility Radeon HD 42xx GPU on 55 nm process; RV620 graphics core; DirectX 10.1; UVD 2

- MMX, SSE, SSE2, SSE3, SSE4a, ABM, Enhanced 3DNow!, NX bit, AMD64, PowerNow!, AMD-V
- Memory support: DDR3 SDRAM, DDR3L SDRAM (Up to 1066 MHz)

=== V series ===
==== Champlain (45 nm) ====
Single-core mobile processor

Model number	Clock speed	L2 cache	FPU width	Hyper Transport	Multi	TDP	Socket	Release date	Part number
V120	2.2 GHz	512 KB	64-bit	1.6 GHz	11×	25 W	S1G4	May 12, 2010	VMV120SGR12GM
V140	2.3 GHz	512 KB	64-bit	1.6 GHz	11.5×	25 W	S1G4	October 4, 2010	VMV140SGR12GM
V160	2.4 GHz	512 KB	64-bit	1.6 GHz	12×	25 W	S1G4	January 4, 2011	VMV160SGR12GM

=== Athlon II ===
==== Champlain (45 nm) ====
Dual-core mobile processor

Model Number	Frequency	L2 cache	FPU width	HT	Mult.	TDP	Socket	Release date	Order Part Number
Athlon II P320	2.1 GHz	2 × 512 KB	64-bit	1.6 GHz	10.5×	25 W	Socket S1G4	May 12, 2010	AMP320SGR22GM
Athlon II P340	2.2 GHz	2 × 512 KB	64-bit	1.6 GHz	11×	25 W	Socket S1G4	October 4, 2010	AMP340SGR22GM
Athlon II P360	2.3 GHz	2 × 512 KB	64-bit	1.6 GHz	11.5×	25 W	Socket S1G4	January 4, 2011	AMP360SGR22GM
Athlon II N330	2.3 GHz	2 × 512 KB	64-bit	1.6 GHz	11.5×	35 W	Socket S1G4	May 12, 2010	AMN330DCR22GM
Athlon II N350	2.4 GHz	2 × 512 KB	64-bit	1.6 GHz	12×	35 W	Socket S1G4	October 4, 2010	AMN350DCR22GM
Athlon II N370	2.5 GHz	2 × 512 KB	64-bit	1.6 GHz	12.5×	35 W	Socket S1G4	January 4, 2011	AMN370DCR22GM

=== Turion II ===
==== Champlain (45 nm) ====
Dual-core mobile processor

Model number	Clock speed	L2 cache	FPU width	Hyper Transport	Multi	TDP	Socket	Release date	Part number
Turion II P520	2.3 GHz	2 × 1 MB	128-bit	1.8 GHz	11.5×	25 W	Socket S1G4	May 12, 2010	TMP520SGR23GM
Turion II P540	2.4 GHz	2 × 1 MB	128-bit	1.8 GHz	12×	25 W	Socket S1G4	October 4, 2010	TMP540SGR23GM
Turion II P560	2.5 GHz	2 × 1 MB	128-bit	1.8 GHz	12.5×	25 W	Socket S1G4	October 19, 2010	TMP560SGR23GM
Turion II N530	2.5 GHz	2 × 1 MB	128-bit	1.8 GHz	12.5×	35 W	Socket S1G4	May 12, 2010	TMN530DCR23GM
Turion II N550	2.6 GHz	2 × 1 MB	128-bit	1.8 GHz	13×	35 W	Socket S1G4	October 4, 2010	TMN550DCR23GM
Turion II N570	2.7 GHz	2 × 1 MB	128-bit	1.8 GHz	13.5×	35 W	Socket S1G4	January 4, 2011	TMN570DCR23GM

=== Phenom II ===
- MMX, SSE, SSE2, SSE3, SSE4a, ABM, Enhanced 3DNow!, NX bit, AMD64, PowerNow!, AMD-V
- Unlike desktop models, mobile Phenom II-based models do not have L3 cache
- Memory support: DDR3 SDRAM, DDR3L SDRAM (Up to 1333 MHz)

==== Champlain (45 nm) ====
Dual-core mobile processor

Model number	Clock speed	L2 cache	FPU width	Hyper Transport	Multi	TDP	Socket	Release date	Part number
Phenom II P650	2.6 GHz	2 × 1 MB	128-bit	1.8 GHz	13×	25 W	Socket S1G4	October 19, 2010	HMP650SGR23GM
Phenom II N620	2.8 GHz	2 × 1 MB	128-bit	1.8 GHz	14×	35 W	Socket S1G4	May 12, 2010	HMN620DCR23GM
Phenom II N640	2.9 GHz	2 × 1 MB	128-bit	1.8 GHz	14.5×	35 W	Socket S1G4	October 4, 2010	HMN640DCR23GM
Phenom II N660	3.0 GHz	2 × 1 MB	128-bit	1.8 GHz	15×	35 W	Socket S1G4	January 4, 2011	HMN660DCR23GM
Phenom II X620 BE	3.1 GHz	2 × 1 MB	128-bit	1.8 GHz	15.5×	45 W	Socket S1G4	May 12, 2010	HMX620HIR23GM
Phenom II X640 BE	3.2 GHz	2 × 1 MB	128-bit	1.8 GHz	16×	45 W	Socket S1G4	May 10, 2011	HMX640HIR23GM

Triple-core mobile processors

Model number	Clock speed	L2 cache	FPU width	Hyper Transport	Multi	TDP	Socket	Release date	Part number
Phenom II P820	1.8 GHz	3 × 512 KB	128-bit	1.8 GHz	9×	25 W	Socket S1G4	May 12, 2010	HMP820SGR32GM
Phenom II P840	1.9 GHz	3 × 512 KB	128-bit	1.8 GHz	9.5×	25 W	Socket S1G4	October 4, 2010	HMP840SGR32GM
Phenom II P860	2.0 GHz	3 × 512 KB	128-bit	1.8 GHz	10×	25 W	Socket S1G4	October 4, 2010	HMP860SGR32GM
Phenom II N830	2.1 GHz	3 × 512 KB	128-bit	1.8 GHz	10.5×	35 W	Socket S1G4	May 12, 2010	HMN830DCR32GM
Phenom II N850	2.2 GHz	3 × 512 KB	128-bit	1.8 GHz	11×	35 W	Socket S1G4	October 4, 2010	HMN850DCR32GM
Phenom II N870	2.3 GHz	3 × 512 KB	128-bit	1.8 GHz	11.5×	35 W	Socket S1G4	January 4, 2011	HMN870DCR32GM

Quad-core mobile processors

Model number	Clock speed	L2 cache	FPU width	Hyper Transport	Multi	TDP	Socket	Release date	Part number
Phenom II P920	1.6 GHz	4 × 512 KB	128-bit	1.8 GHz	8×	25 W	Socket S1G4	May 12, 2010	HMP920SGR42GM
Phenom II P940	1.7 GHz	4 × 512 KB	128-bit	1.8 GHz	8.5×	25 W	Socket S1G4	October 4, 2010	HMP940SGR42GM
Phenom II P960	1.8 GHz	4 × 512 KB	128-bit	1.8 GHz	9×	25 W	Socket S1G4	October 19, 2010	HMP960SGR42GM
Phenom II N930	2.0 GHz	4 × 512 KB	128-bit	1.8 GHz	10×	35 W	Socket S1G4	May 12, 2010	HMN930DCR42GM
Phenom II N950	2.1 GHz	4 × 512 KB	128-bit	1.8 GHz	10.5×	35 W	Socket S1G4	October 4, 2010	HMN950DCR42GM
Phenom II N970	2.2 GHz	4 × 512 KB	128-bit	1.8 GHz	11×	35 W	Socket S1G4	January 4, 2011	HMN970DCR42GM
Phenom II X920 BE	2.3 GHz	4 × 512 KB	128-bit	1.8 GHz	11.5×	45 W	Socket S1G4	May 12, 2010	HMX920HIR42GM
Phenom II X940 BE	2.4 GHz	4 × 512 KB	128-bit	1.8 GHz	12×	45 W	Socket S1G4	January 4, 2011	HMX940HIR42GM

== Brazos platform (2011) ==
AMD Ultrathin Platform introduced on January 5, 2011, as the fourth AMD mobile platform targeting the ultra-portable notebook market. It features the 40 nm AMD Ontario (a 9-watt AMD APU for netbooks and small form factor desktops and devices) and Zacate (an 18-watt TDP APU for ultrathin, mainstream, and value notebooks as well as desktops and all-in-ones) APUs. Both low-power APU versions feature two Bobcat x86 cores and fully support DirectX11, DirectCompute (Microsoft programming interface for GPU computing) and OpenCL (cross-platform programming interface standard for multi-core x86 and accelerated GPU computing). Both also include UVD dedicated hardware acceleration for HD video including 1080p resolutions. This platform consists of:

AMD mobile	Initial platform
Mobile processor	Processors: Single or Dual-core 64-bit AMD APU codenamed Ontario, Zacate and with the following: Bobcat cores made on 40 nm CMOS process; support for DDR3 1066 or 1333 MHz (E-450) memory; 9 W or 18 W TDP; Radeon HD 6xxx GPU on 40 nm process; Cedar graphics core with 80 SP; DirectX 11; UVD 3
Mobile chipset	A50M (Hudson-M1)

=== "Ontario" (40 nm) ===
- SSE, SSE2, SSE3, SSSE3, SSE4a, ABM, NX bit, AMD64, PowerNow!, AMD-V
- Memory support: DDR3 SDRAM, DDR3L SDRAM (Single-channel, up to 1066 MHz)
- 2.5 GT/s UMI.
- Config GPU are Unified shaders : Texture mapping units : Render output units
- Socket FT1 (BGA-413)

Model Number	Step.	CPU						GPU			Memory Support	TDP	Released	Part Number
Model Number	Step.	Cores	Freq.	Turbo	L2 Cache	Mult.	Voltage	Model	Config	Freq.	Memory Support	TDP	Released	Part Number
C-30	B0	1	1.2 GHz	—N/a	512 kB	12×	1.25 – 1.35	HD 6250	80:8:4	276 MHz	DDR3-1066	9 W	January 4, 2011	CMC30AFPB12GT
C-50]	B0	2	1.0 GHz	—N/a	2 × 512 kB	10×	1.05 – 1.35	HD 6250	80:8:4	277 MHz	DDR3-1066	9 W	January 4, 2011	CMC50AFPB22GT
C-60	C0	2	1.0 GHz	1.33 GHz	2 × 512 kB	10×		HD 6290	80:8:4	276 – 400 MHz	DDR3-1066	9 W	August 22, 2011	CMC60AFPB22GV

=== "Zacate" (40 nm) ===
- SSE, SSE2, SSE3, SSSE3, SSE4a, ABM, NX bit, AMD64, PowerNow!, AMD-V
- Memory support: DDR3 SDRAM, DDR3L SDRAM (Single-channel, up to 1066 MHz)
- 2.5 GT/s UMI.
- Config GPU are Unified shaders : Texture mapping units : Render output units
- Socket FT1 (BGA-413)

Model Number	Step.	CPU						GPU			Memory Support	TDP	Released	Part Number
Model Number	Step.	Cores	Freq.	Turbo	L2 Cache	Mult.	Voltage	Model	Config	Freq.	Memory Support	TDP	Released	Part Number
E-240	B0	1	1.5 GHz	—N/a	512 kB	15×	1.175 – 1.35	HD 6310	80:8:4	500 MHz	DDR3-1066	18 W	January 4, 2011	EME240GBB12GT
E-300	B0	2	1.3 GHz	—N/a	2 × 512 kB	13×		HD 6310	80:8:4	488 MHz	DDR3-1066	18 W	August 22, 2011	EME300GBB22GV
E-350	B0	2	1.6 GHz	—N/a	2 × 512 kB	16×	1.25 – 1.35	HD 6310	80:8:4	492 MHz	DDR3-1066	18 W	January 4, 2011	EME350GBB22GT
E-450	B0	2	1.65 GHz	—N/a	2 × 512 kB	16.5×		HD 6320	80:8:4	508 – 600 MHz	DDR3-1333	18 W	August 22, 2011	EME450GBB22GV

== Sabine (Fusion) platform (2011) ==
The Sabine platform introduced on June 30, 2011, for the AMD Mainstream Notebook Platform consists of:

AMD mobile	Initial platform
Mobile processor	Processors: Dual or Quad-core 64-bit AMD APU codenamed Llano, and with the following: made on 32 nm process; support for DDR3 1600 MHz memory; 35 W or 45 W TDP; Radeon HD 6xxxG GPU on 32 nm process; Sumo graphics core with up to 400 SP; DirectX 11; UVD 3
Mobile chipset	A60M, A70M (Hudson-M2, Hudson-M3)

=== "Llano" (32 nm) ===
- SSE, SSE2, SSE3, SSE4a, ABM, Enhanced 3DNow!, NX bit, AMD64, PowerNow!, AMD-V, Turbo Core
- Memory support: 1.35 V DDR3L-1333 memory, in addition to regular 1.5 V DDR3 memory specified (Dual-channel)
- 2.5 GT/s UMI.
- Transistors: 1.148 billion
- Die size: 228 mm^{2}

Model Number	Step.	CPU						GPU			Memory Support	TDP	Socket	Release date	Part Number(s)
Model Number	Step.	Cores	Freq.	Turbo	L2 Cache	Mult.	V_{core}	Model	Config^{1}	Freq.	Memory Support	TDP	Socket	Release date	Part Number(s)
E2-3000M	B0	2	1.8 GHz	2.4 GHz	2 × 512 kB	18x	0.9125 – 1.4125	HD 6380G	160:8:4	400 MHz	DDR3-1333	35 W	FS1	June 14, 2011	EM3000DDX22GX
A4-3300M	B0	2	1.9 GHz	2.5 GHz	2 × 1 MB	19x	0.9125 – 1.4125	HD 6480G	240:12:4	444 MHz	DDR3-1333	35 W	FS1	June 14, 2011	AM3300DDX23GX
A4-3305M	B0	2	1.9 GHz	2.5 GHz	2 × 512 kB	19x	0.8750 – 1.4125	HD 6480G	160:8:4	593 MHz	DDR3-1333	35 W	FS1	December 7, 2011	AM3305DDX22GX
A4-3310MX	B0	2	2.1 GHz	2.5 GHz	2 × 1 MB	21x	0.9125 – 1.4125	HD 6480G	240:12:4	444 MHz	DDR3-1333	35 W	FS1	June 14, 2011	AM3310HLX23GX
A4-3320M	B0	2	2.0 GHz	2.6 GHz	2 × 1 MB	20x	0.9125 – 1.4125	HD 6480G	240:12:4	444 MHz	DDR3-1333	35 W	FS1	December 7, 2011	AM3320DDX23GX
A4-3330MX	B0	2	2.2 GHz	2.6 GHz	2 × 1 MB	22x	0.9125 – 1.4125	HD 6480G	240:12:4	444 MHz	DDR3-1600	45 W	FS1	December 7, 2011	AM3330HLX23GX
A6-3400M	B0	4	1.4 GHz	2.3 GHz	4 × 1 MB	14x	0.9125 – 1.4125	HD 6520G	320:16:8	400 MHz	DDR3-1333	35 W	FS1	June 14, 2011	AM3400DDX43GX
A6-3410MX	B0	4	1.6 GHz	2.3 GHz	4 × 1 MB	16x	0.9125 – 1.4125	HD 6520G	320:16:8	400 MHz	DDR3-1600	45 W	FS1	June 14, 2011	AM3410HLX43GX
A6-3420M	B0	4	1.5 GHz	2.4 GHz	4 × 1 MB	15x	0.9125 – 1.4125	HD 6520G	320:16:8	400 MHz	DDR3-1333	35 W	FS1	December 7, 2011	AM3420DDX43GX
A6-3430MX	B0	4	1.7 GHz	2.4 GHz	4 × 1 MB	17x	0.9125 – 1.4125	HD 6520G	320:16:8	400 MHz	DDR3-1600	45 W	FS1	December 7, 2011	AM3430HLX43GX
A8-3500M	B0	4	1.5 GHz	2.4 GHz	4 × 1 MB	15x	0.9125 – 1.4125	HD 6620G	400:20:8	444 MHz	DDR3-1333	35 W	FS1	June 14, 2011	AM3500DDX43GX
A8-3510MX	B0	4	1.8 GHz	2.5 GHz	4 × 1 MB	18x	0.9125 – 1.4125	HD 6620G	400:20:8	444 MHz	DDR3-1600	45 W	FS1	June 14, 2011	AM3510HLX43GX
A8-3520M	B0	4	1.6 GHz	2.5 GHz	4 × 1 MB	16x	0.9125 – 1.4125	HD 6620G	400:20:8	444 MHz	DDR3-1333	35 W	FS1	December 7, 2011	AM3520DDX43GX
A8-3530MX	B0	4	1.9 GHz	2.6 GHz	4 × 1 MB	19x	0.9125 – 1.4125	HD 6620G	400:20:8	444 MHz	DDR3-1600	45 W	FS1	June 14, 2011	AM3530HLX43GX
A8-3550MX	B0	4	2.0 GHz	2.7 GHz	4 × 1 MB	20x	0.9125 – 1.4125	HD 6620G	400:20:8	444 MHz	DDR3-1600	45 W	FS1	December 7, 2011	AM3550HLX43GX

^{1} Unified shaders : Texture mapping units : Render output units

== Brazos 2.0 platform (2012) ==
AMD Ultrathin Platform introduced on June 6, 2012, as the fourth AMD mobile platform targeting the ultra-portable notebook market. It will feature the 40 nm Zacate (an 18-watt TDP APU for ultrathin, mainstream, and value notebooks as well as desktops and all-in-ones) APUs. This platform consists of:

AMD mobile	Initial platform
Mobile processor	Processors: Dual-core 64-bit AMD APU codenamed Zacate and with the following: Bobcat cores made on 40 nm CMOS process; support for DDR3 1333 MHz memory; 18 W TDP; Radeon HD 7xxx GPU on 40 nm process; Cedar graphics core with 80 SP; DirectX 11; UVD 3
Mobile chipset	A68M (Hudson-M3L)

=== "Ontario", "Zacate" (40 nm) ===
- SSE, SSE2, SSE3, SSSE3, SSE4a, ABM, NX bit, AMD64, PowerNow!, AMD-V
- Single-channel DDR3 SDRAM, DDR3L SDRAM
- 2.5 GT/s UMI.
- Config GPU are Unified shaders : Texture mapping units : Render output units
- Socket FT1 (BGA-413)

Model Number	Step.	CPU						GPU				Memory Support	TDP	Release date	Part Number
Model Number	Step.	Cores	Freq.	Turbo	L2 Cache	Mult.	V_{core}	Model	Config	Freq.	Turbo	Memory Support	TDP	Release date	Part Number
C-70	C0	2	1.0 GHz	1.33 GHz	2 × 512 kB	10×		HD 7290	80:8:4	276 MHz	400 MHz	DDR3-1066	9 W	September 27, 2012	CMC70AFPB22GV
E1-1200	B0	2	1.4 GHz	—N/a	2 × 512 kB	14×		HD 7310	80:8:4	500 MHz	—N/a	DDR3-1066	18 W	June 6, 2012	EM1200GBB22GV
E2-1500	B0	2	1.48 GHz	—N/a	2 × 512 kB			HD 7310	80:8:4	529 MHz	—N/a	DDR3-1066	18 W	January 7, 2013	
E2-1800	B0	2	1.7 GHz	—N/a	2 × 512 kB	17×		HD 7340	80:8:4	523 MHz	680 MHz	DDR3-1333	18 W	June 6, 2012	EM1800GBB22GV
E2-2000	B0	2	1.75 GHz	—N/a	2 × 512 kB			HD 7340	80:8:4	538 MHz	700 MHz	DDR3-1333	18 W	January 7, 2013	

== Comal (Fusion) platform (2012) ==
The Comal platform introduced on May 15, 2012, for the AMD Mainstream Notebook Platform consists of:

AMD mobile	Initial platform
Mobile processor	Processors: Dual or Quad-core 64-bit AMD APU codenamed Trinity, and with the following: Piledriver cores made on 32 nm process; support for DDR3 1600 MHz memory; 17 W, 25 W or 35 W TDP; Radeon HD 7xxxG GPU on 32 nm process; Devastator graphics core with up to 384 SP; DirectX 11; UVD 3.2
Mobile chipset	A70M (Hudson-M3)

=== "Trinity" (2012, 32 nm) ===
- MMX, SSE, SSE2, SSE3, SSSE3, SSE4.1, SSE4.2, SSE4a, NX bit, AMD64, AMD-V, AES, CLMUL, AVX, XOP, FMA3, FMA4, CVT16, F16C, Turbo Core
- Memory support: 1.35 V DDR3L-1600 memory, in addition to regular 1.5 V DDR3 memory specified (Dual-channel)
- 2.5 GT/s UMI.
- Transistors: 1.303 billion
- Die size: 246 mm^{2}

Model Number	Step.	CPU						GPU				Memory Support	TDP	Socket	Release date	Part Number(s)
Model Number	Step.	Cores	Freq.	Turbo	L2 Cache	Mult.	V_{core}	Model	Config^{1}	Freq.	Turbo	Memory Support	TDP	Socket	Release date	Part Number(s)
standard power
A4-4300M	B0	2	2.5 GHz	3.0 GHz	1 MB	25×	0.8125 – 1.3	HD 7420G	128:8:4	480 MHz	655 MHz	DDR3-1600	35 W	FS1r2	May 2012	AM4300DEC23HJ
A6-4400M	B0	2	2.7 GHz	3.2 GHz	1 MB	27×	0.8125 – 1.3	HD 7520G	192:12:4	496 MHz	685 MHz	DDR3-1600	35 W	FS1r2	May 15, 2012	AM4400DEC23HJ
A8-4500M	B0	4	1.9 GHz	2.8 GHz	2 × 2 MB	19×	0.8125 – 1.3	HD 7640G	256:16:8	496 MHz	685 MHz	DDR3-1600	35 W	FS1r2	May 15, 2012	AM4500DEC44HJ
A10-4600M	B0	4	2.3 GHz	3.2 GHz	2 × 2 MB	23×	0.8125 – 1.3	HD 7660G	384:24:8	496 MHz	685 MHz	DDR3-1600	35 W	FS1r2	May 15, 2012	AM4600DEC44HJ
low power
A4-4355M	B0	2	1.9 GHz	2.4 GHz	1 MB	21×		HD 7400G	192:12:4	327 MHz	424 MHz	DDR3-1333	17 W	FP2	September 27, 2012	AM4355SHE23HJ
A6-4455M	B0	2	2.1 GHz	2.6 GHz	2 MB	21×	0.775 – 1.15	HD 7500G	256:16:8	327 MHz	424 MHz	DDR3-1333	17 W	FP2	May 15, 2012	AM4455SHE24HJ
A8-4555M	B0	4	1.6 GHz	2.4 GHz	2 × 2 MB	16×		HD 7600G	384:24:8	320 MHz	424 MHz	DDR3-1333	19 W	FP2	September 27, 2012	AM4555SHE44HJ
A10-4655M	B0	4	2.0 GHz	2.8 GHz	2 × 2 MB	20×	0.85 – 1.2	HD 7620G	384:24:8	360 MHz	496 MHz	DDR3-1333	25 W	FP2	May 15, 2012	AM4655SIE44HJ

^{1} Config GPU are Unified shaders : Texture mapping units : Render output units

=== "Richland" (2013, 32 nm) ===
- Elite Performance APU.
- MMX, SSE, SSE2, SSE3, SSSE3, SSE4.1, SSE4.2, SSE4a, NX bit, AMD64, AMD-V, AES, CLMUL, AVX, XOP, FMA3, FMA4, CVT16, F16C, Turbo Core
- Memory support: 1.35 V DDR3L-1600 memory, in addition to regular 1.5 V DDR3 memory specified (Dual-channel)
- 2.5 GT/s UMI.
- Transistors: 1.303 billion
- Die size: 246 mm^{2}

Model Number	Step.	CPU						GPU				Memory Support	TDP	Socket	Release date	Part Number(s)
Model Number	Step.	Cores	Freq.	Turbo	L2 Cache	Mult.	V_{core}	Model	Config	Freq.	Turbo	Memory Support	TDP	Socket	Release date	Part Number(s)
standard power
A4-5150M		2	2.7 GHz	3.3 GHz	1 MB			HD 8350G	128:8:4	533 MHz	720 MHz	DDR3-1600	35 W	FS1r2	Q1 2013	AM5150DEC23HL
A6-5350M		2	2.9 GHz	3.5 GHz	1 MB			HD 8450G	192:12:4	533 MHz	720 MHz	DDR3-1600	35 W	FS1r2	Q1 2013	AM5350DEC23HL
A6-5357M		2	2.9 GHz	3.5 GHz	1 MB			HD 8450G	192	533 MHz	720 MHz	DDR3L-1600	35 W	FP2 (BGA)	May 2013	AM5357DFE23HL
A8-5550M		4	2.1 GHz	3.1 GHz	2 × 2 MB			HD 8550G	256:16:8	515 MHz	720 MHz	DDR3-1600	35 W	FS1r2	Q1 2013	AM5550DEC44HL
A8-5557M		4	2.1 GHz	3.1 GHz	2 × 2 MB			HD 8550G	256	554 MHz	720 MHz	DDR3L-1600	35 W	FP2 (BGA)	May 2013	AM5557DFE44HL
A10-5750M		4	2.5 GHz	3.5 GHz	2 × 2 MB			HD 8650G	384:24:8	533 MHz	720 MHz	DDR3-1866	35 W	FS1r2	Q1 2013	AM5750DEC44HL
A10-5757M		4	2.5 GHz	3.5 GHz	2 × 2 MB			HD 8650G	384	600 MHz	720 MHz	DDR3L-1600	35 W	FP2 (BGA)	May 2013	AM5757DFE44HL
low power
A4-5145M		2	2.0 GHz	2.6 GHz	1 MB			HD 8310G	128	424 MHz	554 MHz	DDR3L-1333	17 W	FP2 (BGA)	May 2013	AM5145SIE44HL?
A6-5345M		2	2.2 GHz	2.8 GHz	1 MB			HD 8410G	192	450 MHz	600 MHz	DDR3L-1333	17 W	FP2 (BGA)	May 2013	AM5345SIE44HL?
A8-5545M		4	1.7 GHz	2.7 GHz	2 × 2 MB			HD 8510G	384	450 MHz	554 MHz	DDR3L-1333	19 W	FP2 (BGA)	May 2013	AM5545SIE44HL
A10-5745M		4	2.1 GHz	2.9 GHz	2 × 2 MB			HD 8610G	384	533 MHz	626 MHz	DDR3L-1333	25 W	FP2 (BGA)	May 2013	AM5745SIE44HL

^{1} Config GPU are Unified shaders : Texture mapping units : Render output units

== Jaguar (2013) ==
AMD mobile	Initial platform
Mobile processor	Processors: Dual-core or quad-core 64-bit AMD APU codenamed Kabini, Temash and with the following: Jaguar cores made on 28 nm CMOS process; support for Single-channel DDR3 SDRAM and DDR3L SDRAM 1600 MHz memory; 3.9 – 25 W TDP; Radeon HD 8xxx GPU on 28 nm process; Graphics core with 128 SP; GPU based on Graphics Core Next architecture; DirectX 11.1; Video Coding Engine; Integrated FCH; SSE, SSE2, SSE3, SSSE3, SSE4a, SSE4.1, SSE4.2, AVX, CLMUL, AES, F16C, ABM, BMI1, NX bit, AMD64, PowerNow!, AMD-V; Socket FT3 (BGA); Turbo Dock Technology, C6 and CC6 low power states

=== "Temash" (2013, 28 nm) ===
Elite Mobility APU:

Model	Step.	CPU						GPU				Memory	TDP	Released	Part Number
Model	Step.	Cores	Freq.	Turbo	L2 Cache	Mult.^{1}	V_{core}	Model	Config^{1}	Freq.	Turbo	Memory	TDP	Released	Part Number
A4-1200	B0	2	1.0 GHz	—N/a	1 MB			HD 8180	128:8:4	225 MHz	—N/a	DDR3L-1066	3.9 W	May 2013	AT1200IFJ23HM
A4-1250	B0	2	1.0 GHz	—N/a	1 MB			HD 8210	128:8:4	300 MHz	—N/a	DDR3L-1333	8 W	May 2013	AT1250IDJ23HM
A6-1450	B0	4	1.0 GHz	1.4 GHz	2 MB			HD 8250	128:8:4	300 MHz	400 MHz	DDR3L-1066	8 W	May 2013	AT1450IDJ44HM

^{1} Unified shaders : Texture mapping units : Render output units

=== "Kabini" (2013, 28 nm) ===
Mainstream APU:

Model	Step.	CPU						GPU				Memory	TDP	Released	Part Number
Model	Step.	Cores	Freq.	Turbo	L2 Cache	Mult.^{1}	V_{core}	Model	Config^{1}	Freq.	Turbo	Memory	TDP	Released	Part Number
E1-2100	B0	2	1.0 GHz	—N/a	1 MB			HD 8210	128:8:4	300 MHz	—N/a	DDR3L-1333	9 W	May 2013	EM2100ICJ23HM
E1-2500	B0	2	1.4 GHz	—N/a	1 MB			HD 8240	128:8:4	400 MHz	—N/a	DDR3L-1333	15 W	May 2013	EM2500IBJ23HM
E2-3000	B0	2	1.65 GHz	—N/a	1 MB			HD 8280	128:8:4	450 MHz	—N/a	DDR3L-1600	15 W	May 2013	EM3000IBJ23HM
A4-5000	B0	4	1.5 GHz	—N/a	2 MB			HD 8330	128:8:4	500 MHz	—N/a	DDR3L-1600	15 W	May 2013	AM5000IBJ44HM
A6-5200	B0	4	2.0 GHz	—N/a	2 MB			HD 8400	128:8:4	600 MHz	—N/a	DDR3L-1600	25 W	May 2013	AM5200IAJ44HM

^{1} Unified shaders : Texture mapping units : Render output units

== Puma (2014) ==
=== Mullins, Tablet/2-in-1 APU ===
Model	Stepping	CPU						GPU				Memory support	TDP	Released	Part number
Model	Stepping	Cores	Frequency	Turbo	L2 Cache	Multi^{1}	V_{core}	Model	Config^{2}	Frequency	Turbo	Memory support	TDP	Released	Part number
E1 Micro-6200T		2	1.0 GHz	1.4 GHz	1 MB		0.50 – 1.40 V	R2	128:8:4		300 MHz	DDR3L-1066	3.95 W	Q2 2014	EM620TIWJ23JB
A4 Micro-6400T		4	1.0 GHz	1.6 GHz	2 MB		0.50 – 1.40 V	R3	128:8:4		350 MHz	DDR3L-1333	4.5 W	Q2 2014	AM640TIVJ44JB
A10 Micro-6700T		4	1.2 GHz	2.2 GHz	2 MB		0.50 – 1.40 V	R6	128:8:4		500 MHz	DDR3L-1333	4.5 W	Q2 2014	AM670TIVJ44JB

=== Beema, Notebook APU ===
Model	Stepping	CPU						GPU				Memory support	TDP	Released	Part number
Model	Stepping	Cores	Frequency	Turbo	L2 Cache	Multi^{1}	V_{core}	Model	Config^{2}	Frequency	Turbo	Memory support	TDP	Released	Part number
E1-6010		2	1.35 GHz	—N/a	1 MB		0.50 – 1.40 V	R2	128:8:4		350 MHz	DDR3L-1333	10 W	Q2 2014	EM6010IUJ23JB
E2-6110		4	1.5 GHz	—N/a	2 MB		0.50 – 1.40 V	R2	128:8:4		500 MHz	DDR3L-1600	15 W	Q2 2014	EM6110ITJ44JB
A4-6210		4	1.8 GHz	—N/a	2 MB		0.50 – 1.40 V	R3	128:8:4		600 MHz	DDR3L-1600	15 W	Q2 2014	AM6210ITJ44JB
A6-6310		4	1.8 GHz	2.4 GHz	2 MB		0.50 – 1.40 V	R4	128:8:4		800 MHz	DDR3L-1866	15 W	Q2 2014	AM6310ITJ44JB
A8-6410		4	2 GHz	2.4 GHz	2 MB		0.50 – 1.40 V	R5	128:8:4		800 MHz	DDR3L-1866	15 W	Q2 2014	AM6410ITJ44JB

== Kaveri (2014) ==
Model number	CPU						GPU				Memory support	TDP	Socket	Released	Part number
Model number	Cores	Frequency	Turbo	L2 Cache	Multi	V_{core}	Model	Config	Frequency	Turbo	Memory support	TDP	Socket	Released	Part number
low power
A6-7000	2	2.2 GHz	3.0 GHz	1 MB	22×		R4	192:12:4	494 MHz	533 MHz	DDR3-1333	17W	FP3	June 2014	AM7000ECH23JA
A6 Pro-7050B	2	2.2 GHz	3.0 GHz	1 MB	22×		R4	192:12:4	553 MHz	—N/a	DDR3-1333	17W	FP3	June 2014	AM705BECH23JA
A8-7100	4	1.8 GHz	3.0 GHz	2× 2 MB	18×		R5	256:16:4	450 MHz	514 MHz	DDR3-1600	19W	FP3	June 2014	AM7100ECH44JA
A8 Pro-7150B	4	1.9 GHz	3.2 GHz	2× 2 MB	19×		R5	256:16:4	553 MHz	—N/a	DDR3-1600	19W	FP3	June 2014	AM715BECH44JA
A10-7300	4	1.9 GHz	3.2 GHz	2× 2 MB	19×		R6	384:24:8	464 MHz	533 MHz	DDR3-1600	19W	FP3	June 2014	AM7300ECH44JA
A10 Pro-7350B	4	2.1 GHz	3.3 GHz	2× 2 MB	21×		R6	384:24:8	553 MHz	—N/a	DDR3-1600	19W	FP3	June 2014	AM735BECH44JA
FX-7500	4	2.1 GHz	3.3 GHz	2× 2 MB	21×		R7	384:24:8	498 MHz	533 MHz	DDR3-1600	19W	FP3	June 2014	FM7500ECH44JA
standard power
A8-7200P	4	2.4 GHz	3.3 GHz	2× 2 MB	24×		R5	256:16:4	553 MHz	626 MHz	DDR3-1866	35W	FP3	June 2014	AM740PDGH44JA
A10-7400P	4	2.5 GHz	3.4 GHz	2× 2 MB	25×		R6	384:24:8	576 MHz	654 MHz	DDR3-1866	35W	FP3	June 2014	AM740PDGH44JA
FX-7600P	4	2.7 GHz	3.6 GHz	2× 2 MB	27×		R7	512:32:8	600 MHz	686 MHz	DDR3-2133	35W	FP3	June 2014	FM760PDGH44JA

== Carrizo-L (2015) ==
Model	Stepping	CPU						GPU				Memory support	TDP	Released	Part number
Model	Stepping	Cores	Frequency	Turbo	L2 Cache	Multi^{1}	V_{core}	Model	Config^{2}	Frequency	Turbo	Memory support	TDP	Released	Part number
E1-7010		2	1.5 GHz	—N/a	1 MB		0.50 – 1.40 V	R2	128:8:4		400 MHz	DDR3L-1333	10 W	May 2015	EM7010IUJ23JB
E2-7110		4	1.8 GHz	—N/a	2 MB		0.50 – 1.40 V	R2	128:8:4		600 MHz	DDR3L-1600	12-25 W	May 2015	EM7110ITJ44JB
A4-7210		4	1.8 GHz	2.2 GHz	2 MB		0.50 – 1.40 V	R3	128:8:4		686 MHz	DDR3L-1600	12-25 W	May 2015	AM7210ITJ44JB
A6-7310		4	2.0 GHz	2.4 GHz	2 MB		0.50 – 1.40 V	R4	128:8:4		800 MHz	DDR3L-1866	12-25 W	May 2015	AM7310ITJ44JB
A8-7410		4	2.2 GHz	2.5 GHz	2 MB		0.50 – 1.40 V	R5	128:8:4		847 MHz	DDR3L-1866	12-25 W	May 2015	AM7410ITJ44JB

== Carrizo (2015) ==
Model number	CPU						GPU				Memory support	TDP	Socket	Released	Part number
Model number	Cores	Frequency	Turbo	L2 Cache	Multi	V_{core}	Model	Config	Frequency	Turbo	Memory support	TDP	Socket	Released	Part number
standard power and low power (configurable TDP)
A6-8500P	2	1.6 GHz	3.0 GHz	1 MB	16×		R5	256:16:4	800 MHz	—N/a	DDR3-1600	12-35W	FP4	June 2015	AM850PAAY23KA
A6 PRO-8500B	2	1.6 GHz	3.0 GHz	1 MB	16×		R5	256:16:4	800 MHz	—N/a	DDR3-1600	12-35W	FP4	June 2015	AM850BAAY23KA
A8-8600P	4	1.6 GHz	3.0 GHz	2× 1 MB	16×		R6	384:24:8	720 MHz	—N/a	DDR3-2133	12-35W	FP4	June 2015	AM860PAAY43KA
A8 PRO-8600B	4	1.6 GHz	3.0 GHz	2× 1 MB	16×		R6	384:24:8	720 MHz	—N/a	DDR3-2133	12-35W	FP4	June 2015	AM860BAAY43KA
A10-8700P	4	1.8 GHz	3.2 GHz	2× 1 MB	18×		R6	384:24:8	800 MHz	—N/a	DDR3-2133	12-35W	FP4	June 2015	AM870PAAY43KA
A10 Pro-8700B	4	1.8 GHz	3.2 GHz	2× 1 MB	18×		R6	384:24:8	800 MHz	—N/a	DDR3-2133	12-35W	FP4	June 2015	AM870BAAY43KA
FX-8800P	4	2.1 GHz	3.4 GHz	2× 1 MB	21×		R7	512:32:8	800 MHz	—N/a	DDR3-2133	12-35W	FP4	June 2015	FM880PAAY43KA
A12 Pro-8800B	4	2.1 GHz	3.4 GHz	2× 1 MB	21×		R7	512:32:8	800 MHz	—N/a	DDR3-2133	12-35W	FP4	June 2015	FM880BAAY43KA

== Bristol Ridge (2016) ==
Model number	CPU						GPU				Memory support	TDP	Socket	Released	Part number
Model number	Cores	Frequency	Turbo	L2 Cache	Multi	V_{core}	Model	Config	Frequency	Turbo	Memory support	TDP	Socket	Released	Part number
standard power and low power (configurable TDP)
A10-9600P	4	2.4 GHz	3.3 GHz	2× 1 MB			R5	384:24:8	720 MHz	—N/a	DDR4-1866	12–15W	FP4	June 2016	AM960PADY44AB
A10-9600B PRO	4	2.4 GHz	3.3 GHz	2× 1 MB			R5	384:24:8	720 MHz	—N/a	DDR4-1866	12–15W	FP4	October 2016	AM960BADY44AB
A10-9630P	4	2.6 GHz	3.3 GHz	2× 1 MB			R5	384:24:8	800 MHz	—N/a	DDR4-2400	25–45W	FP4	June 2016	AM963PAEY44AB
A10-9630B PRO	4	2.6 GHz	3.3 GHz	2× 1 MB			R5	384:24:8	800 MHz	—N/a	DDR4-2400	25–45W	FP4	October 2016	AM963BAEY44AB
A12-9700P	4	2.5 GHz	3.4 GHz	2× 1 MB			R7	384:24:8	758 MHz	—N/a	DDR4-1866	12–15W	FP4	June 2016	AM970PADY44AB
A12-9700B PRO	4	2.5 GHz	3.4 GHz	2× 1 MB			R7	384:24:8	758 MHz	—N/a	DDR4-1866	12–15W	FP4	October 2016	AM970BADY44AB
A12-9730P	4	2.8 GHz	3.5 GHz	2× 1 MB			R7	384:24:8	900 MHz	—N/a	DDR4-2400	25–45W	FP4	June 2016	AM973PAEY44AB
A12-9730B PRO	4	2.8 GHz	3.5 GHz	2× 1 MB			R7	384:24:8	900 MHz	—N/a	DDR4-2400	25–45W	FP4	October 2016	AM973BAEY44AB
FX-9800P	4	2.7 GHz	3.6 GHz	2× 1 MB			R7	512:32:8	758 MHz	—N/a	DDR4-1866	12–15W	FP4	June 2016	FM980PADY44AB
A12-9800B PRO	4	2.7 GHz	3.6 GHz	2× 1 MB			R7	512:32:8	758 MHz	—N/a	DDR4-1866	12–15W	FP4	October 2016	AM980BADY44AB
FX-9830P	4	3.0 GHz	3.7 GHz	2× 1 MB			R7	512:32:8	900 MHz	—N/a	DDR4-2400	25–45W	FP4	June 2016	FM983PAEY44AB
A12-9830B PRO	4	3.0 GHz	3.7 GHz	2× 1 MB			R7	512:32:8	900 MHz	—N/a	DDR4-2400	25–45W	FP4	October 2016	AM983BAEY44AB

== "Raven Ridge" (2017) ==
Model	Release date	Fab	CPU						GPU				Socket	PCIe lanes	Memory support	TDP
Model	Release date	Fab	Cores (threads)	Clock rate (GHz)		Cache			Model	Config (Note: Unified shaders : Texture mapping units : Render output units and Compute units (CU))	Clock (MHz)	Processing power (GFLOPS) (Note: Single precision performance is calculated from the base (or boost) core clock speed based on a FMA operation.)	Socket	PCIe lanes	Memory support	TDP
Model	Release date	Fab	Cores (threads)	Base	Boost	L1	L2	L3	Model	Config	Clock (MHz)	Processing power (GFLOPS)	Socket	PCIe lanes	Memory support	TDP
Athlon Pro 200U	2019	GloFo; 14LP	2 (4)	2.3	3.2	64 KB inst. 32 KB data per core	512 KB per core	4 MB	Radeon Vega 3	192:12:4; 3 CU	1000	384	FP5	12 (8+4)	DDR4-2400 dual-channel	12–25 W
Athlon 300U	Jan 6, 2019	GloFo; 14LP	2 (4)	2.4	3.3	64 KB inst. 32 KB data per core	512 KB per core	4 MB	Radeon Vega 3	192:12:4; 3 CU	1000	384	FP5	12 (8+4)	DDR4-2400 dual-channel	12–25 W
Ryzen 3 2200U	Jan 8, 2018	GloFo; 14LP	2 (4)	2.5	3.4	64 KB inst. 32 KB data per core	512 KB per core	4 MB	Radeon Vega 3	192:12:4; 3 CU	1100	422.4	FP5	12 (8+4)	DDR4-2400 dual-channel	12–25 W
Ryzen 3 3200U	Jan 6, 2019	GloFo; 14LP	2 (4)	2.6	3.5	64 KB inst. 32 KB data per core	512 KB per core	4 MB	Radeon Vega 3	192:12:4; 3 CU	1200	460.8	FP5	12 (8+4)	DDR4-2400 dual-channel	12–25 W
Ryzen 3 2300U	Jan 8, 2018	GloFo; 14LP	4 (4)	2.0	3.4	64 KB inst. 32 KB data per core	512 KB per core	4 MB	Radeon Vega 6	384:24:8; 6 CU	1100	844.8	FP5	12 (8+4)	DDR4-2400 dual-channel	12–25 W
Ryzen 3 Pro 2300U	May 15, 2018	GloFo; 14LP	4 (4)	2.0	3.4	64 KB inst. 32 KB data per core	512 KB per core	4 MB	Radeon Vega 6	384:24:8; 6 CU	1100	844.8	FP5	12 (8+4)	DDR4-2400 dual-channel	12–25 W
Ryzen 5 2500U	Oct 26, 2017	GloFo; 14LP	4 (8)	2.0	3.6	64 KB inst. 32 KB data per core	512 KB per core	4 MB	Radeon Vega 8	512:32:16; 8 CU	1100	1126.4	FP5	12 (8+4)	DDR4-2400 dual-channel	12–25 W
Ryzen 5 Pro 2500U	May 15, 2018	GloFo; 14LP	4 (8)	2.0	3.6	64 KB inst. 32 KB data per core	512 KB per core	4 MB	Radeon Vega 8	512:32:16; 8 CU	1100	1126.4	FP5	12 (8+4)	DDR4-2400 dual-channel	12–25 W
Ryzen 5 2600H	Sep 10, 2018	GloFo; 14LP	4 (8)	3.2	3.6	64 KB inst. 32 KB data per core	512 KB per core	4 MB	Radeon Vega 8	512:32:16; 8 CU	1100	1126.4	FP5	12 (8+4)	DDR4-3200 dual-channel	35–54 W
Ryzen 7 2700U	Oct 26, 2017	GloFo; 14LP	4 (8)	2.2	3.8	64 KB inst. 32 KB data per core	512 KB per core	4 MB	Radeon RX Vega 10	640:40:16; 10 CU	1300	1664	FP5	12 (8+4)	DDR4-2400 dual-channel	12–25 W
Ryzen 7 Pro 2700U	May 15, 2018	GloFo; 14LP	4 (8)	2.2	3.8	64 KB inst. 32 KB data per core	512 KB per core	4 MB	Radeon Vega 10	640:40:16; 10 CU	1300	1664	FP5	12 (8+4)	DDR4-2400 dual-channel	12–25 W
Ryzen 7 2800H	Sep 10, 2018	GloFo; 14LP	4 (8)	3.3	3.8	64 KB inst. 32 KB data per core	512 KB per core	4 MB	Radeon RX Vega 11	704:44:16; 11 CU	1300	1830.4	FP5	12 (8+4)	DDR4-3200 dual-channel	35–54 W

== "Picasso" (2019) ==
Common features of Ryzen 3000 notebook APUs:

- Socket: FP5.
- All the CPUs support DDR4-2400 in dual-channel mode.
- L1 cache: 96 KB (32 KB data + 64 KB instruction) per core.
- L2 cache: 512 KB per core.
- All the CPUs support 16 PCIe 3.0 lanes.
- Includes integrated GCN 5th generation GPU.
- Fabrication process: GlobalFoundries 12LP (14LP+).

Branding and Model		CPU					GPU				TDP	Release date
Branding and Model		Cores (threads)	Clock rate (GHz)		L3 cache (total)	Core config (Note: Core Complexes (CCX) × cores per CCX)	Model	Clock (GHz)	Config (Note: Unified Shaders : Texture Mapping Units : Render Output Units and Compute Units (CU))	Processing power (GFLOPS) (Note: Single precision performance is calculated from the base (or boost) core clock speed based on a FMA operation.)	TDP	Release date
Branding and Model		Cores (threads)	Base	Boost	L3 cache (total)	Core config	Model	Clock (GHz)	Config	Processing power (GFLOPS)	TDP	Release date
Ryzen 7	3780U	4 (8)	2.3	4.0	4 MB	1 × 4	RX Vega 11	1.4	704:44:16; 11 CU	1971.2	15 W	Oct 2019
Ryzen 7	3750H	4 (8)	2.3	4.0	4 MB	1 × 4	RX Vega 10	1.4	640:40:16; 10 CU	1792.0	35 W	Jan 6, 2019
Ryzen 7	3700C	4 (8)	2.3	4.0	4 MB	1 × 4	RX Vega 10	1.4	640:40:16; 10 CU	1792.0	15 W	Sep 22, 2020
Ryzen 7	3700U (Note: Model also available as PRO version, released April 8, 2019.)	4 (8)	2.3	4.0	4 MB	1 × 4	RX Vega 10	1.4	640:40:16; 10 CU	1792.0	15 W	Jan 6, 2019
Ryzen 5	3580U	4 (8)	2.1	3.7	4 MB	1 × 4	Vega 9	1.3	576:36:16; 9 CU	1497.6	15 W	Oct 2019
Ryzen 5	3550H	4 (8)	2.1	3.7	4 MB	1 × 4	Vega 8	1.2	512:32:8; 8 CU	1228.8	35 W	Jan 6, 2019
Ryzen 5	3500C	4 (8)	2.1	3.7	4 MB	1 × 4	Vega 8	1.2	512:32:8; 8 CU	1228.8	15 W	Sep 22, 2020
Ryzen 5	3500U	4 (8)	2.1	3.7	4 MB	1 × 4	Vega 8	1.2	512:32:8; 8 CU	1228.8	15 W	Jan 6, 2019
Ryzen 5	3450U	4 (8)	2.1	3.5	4 MB	1 × 4	Vega 8	1.2	512:32:8; 8 CU	1228.8	15 W	Jun 2020
Ryzen 3	3350U	4 (4)	2.1	3.5	4 MB	1 × 4	Vega 6	1.2	384:24:8; 6 CU	921.6	15 W	Jan 6, 2019
Ryzen 3	3300U	4 (4)	2.1	3.5	4 MB	1 × 4	Vega 6	1.2	384:24:8; 6 CU	921.6	15 W	Jan 6, 2019

== "Renoir" (2020) ==
=== U ===
Branding and model		CPU					GPU				TDP	Release date
Branding and model		Cores (threads)	Clock rate (GHz)		L3 cache (total)	Core config (Note: Core Complexes (CCX) × cores per CCX)	Model	Clock (MHz)	Config (Note: Unified shaders : texture mapping units : render output units and compute units (CU))	Processing power (GFLOPS) (Note: Single precision performance is calculated from the base (or boost) core clock speed based on a FMA operation.)	TDP	Release date
Branding and model		Cores (threads)	Base	Boost	L3 cache (total)	Core config	Model	Clock (MHz)	Config	Processing power (GFLOPS)	TDP	Release date
Ryzen 7	4980U	8 (16)	2.0	4.4	8 MB	2 × 4	Radeon; Graphics (Note: All of the iGPUs are branded as AMD Radeon Graphics.)	1950	512:32:8; 8 CU	1996.8	15 W	Apr 13, 2021
Ryzen 7	4800U	8 (16)	1.8	4.2	8 MB	2 × 4	Radeon; Graphics	1750	512:32:8; 8 CU	1792	15 W	Mar 16, 2020
Ryzen 7	Pro 4750U	8 (16)	1.7	4.1	8 MB	2 × 4	Radeon; Graphics	1600	448:28:8; 7 CU	1433.6	15 W	May 7, 2020
Ryzen 7	4700U	8 (8)	2.0	4.1	8 MB	2 × 4	Radeon; Graphics	1600	448:28:8; 7 CU	1433.6	15 W	Mar 16, 2020
Ryzen 5	4680U	6 (12)	2.1	4.0	8 MB	2 × 3	Radeon; Graphics	1500	448:28:8; 7 CU	1344	15 W	Apr 13, 2021
Ryzen 5	Pro 4650U	6 (12)	2.1	4.0	8 MB	2 × 3	Radeon; Graphics	1500	384:24:8; 6 CU	1152	15 W	May 7, 2020
Ryzen 5	4600U	6 (12)	2.1	4.0	8 MB	2 × 3	Radeon; Graphics	1500	384:24:8; 6 CU	1152	15 W	Mar 16, 2020
Ryzen 5	4500U	6 (6)	2.3	4.0	8 MB	2 × 3	Radeon; Graphics	1500	384:24:8; 6 CU	1152	15 W	Mar 16, 2020
Ryzen 3	Pro 4450U	4 (8)	2.5	3.7	4 MB	1 × 4	Radeon; Graphics	1400	320:20:8; 5 CU	896	15 W	May 7, 2020
Ryzen 3	4300U	4 (4)	2.7	3.7	4 MB	1 × 4	Radeon; Graphics	1400	320:20:8; 5 CU	896	15 W	Mar 16, 2020

=== H ===
Branding and model		CPU					GPU				TDP	Release date
Branding and model		Cores (threads)	Clock rate (GHz)		L3 cache (total)	Core config (Note: Core Complexes (CCX) × cores per CCX)	Model	Clock (MHz)	Config (Note: Unified shaders : texture mapping units : render output units and compute units (CU))	Processing power (GFLOPS) (Note: Single precision performance is calculated from the base (or boost) core clock speed based on a FMA operation.)	TDP	Release date
Branding and model		Cores (threads)	Base	Boost	L3 cache (total)	Core config	Model	Clock (MHz)	Config	Processing power (GFLOPS)	TDP	Release date
Ryzen 9	4900H	8 (16)	3.3	4.4	8 MB	2 × 4	Radeon; Graphics (Note: All of the iGPUs are branded as AMD Radeon Graphics.)	1750	512:32:8; 8 CU	1792	45 W	Mar 16, 2020
Ryzen 9	4900HS	8 (16)	3.0	4.3	8 MB	2 × 4	Radeon; Graphics	1750	512:32:8; 8 CU	1792	35 W	Mar 16, 2020
Ryzen 7	4800H	8 (16)	2.9	4.2	8 MB	2 × 4	Radeon; Graphics	1600	448:28:8; 7 CU	1433.6	45 W	Mar 16, 2020
Ryzen 7	4800HS	8 (16)	2.9	4.2	8 MB	2 × 4	Radeon; Graphics	1600	448:28:8; 7 CU	1433.6	45 W	Mar 16, 2020
Ryzen 5	4600H	6 (12)	3.0	4.0	8 MB	2 × 3	Radeon; Graphics	1500	384:24:8; 6 CU	1152	45 W	Mar 16, 2020
Ryzen 5	4600HS	6 (12)	3.0	4.0	8 MB	2 × 3	Radeon; Graphics	1500	384:24:8; 6 CU	1152	35 W	Mar 16, 2020

== "Lucienne" (2021) ==
Common features of Ryzen 5000 notebook APUs:

- Socket: FP6.
- All the CPUs support DDR4-3200 or LPDDR4-4266 in dual-channel mode.
- L1 cache: 64 KB (32 KB data + 32 KB instruction) per core.
- L2 cache: 512 KB per core.
- All the CPUs support 16 PCIe 3.0 lanes.
- Includes integrated GCN 5th generation GPU.
- Fabrication process: TSMC 7FF.

Branding and Model		CPU					GPU				TDP	Release date
Branding and Model		Cores (threads)	Clock rate (GHz)		L3 cache (total)	Core config (Note: Core Complexes (CCX) × cores per CCX)	Model	Clock (GHz)	Config (Note: Unified shaders : texture mapping units : render output units and compute units (CU))	Processing power (GFLOPS) (Note: Single precision performance is calculated from the base (or boost) core clock speed based on a FMA operation.)	TDP	Release date
Branding and Model		Cores (threads)	Base	Boost	L3 cache (total)	Core config	Model	Clock (GHz)	Config	Processing power (GFLOPS)	TDP	Release date
Ryzen 7	5700U	8 (16)	1.8	4.3	8 MB	2 × 4	Radeon; Graphics (Note: All of the iGPUs are branded as AMD Radeon Graphics.)	1.9	512:32:8; 8 CU	1945.6	10–25 W	Jan 12, 2021
Ryzen 5	5500U	6 (12)	2.1	4.0	8 MB	2 × 3	Radeon; Graphics	1.8	448:28:8; 7 CU	1612.8	10–25 W	Jan 12, 2021
Ryzen 3	5300U	4 (8)	2.6	3.8	4 MB	1 × 4	Radeon; Graphics	1.5	384:24:8; 6 CU	1152	10–25 W	Jan 12, 2021

== "Cezanne" (2021) ==
=== U ===
Branding and model		CPU					GPU				TDP	Release date
Branding and model		Cores (Threads)	Clock rate (GHz)		L3 cache (total)	Core config (Note: Core Complexes (CCX) × cores per CCX)	Model	Clock (GHz)	Config (Note: Unified shaders : texture mapping units : render output units and compute units (CU))	Processing power (GFLOPS) (Note: Single precision performance is calculated from the base (or boost) core clock speed based on a FMA operation.)	TDP	Release date
Branding and model		Cores (Threads)	Base	Boost	L3 cache (total)	Core config	Model	Clock (GHz)	Config	Processing power (GFLOPS)	TDP	Release date
Ryzen 7	5800U (Note: Model also available as Pro version as 5450U, 5650U, 5850U, released on March 16, 2021.)	8 (16)	1.9	4.4	16 MB	1 × 8	Radeon; Graphics (Note: All of the iGPUs are branded as AMD Radeon Graphics.)	2.0	512:32:8; 8 CUs	2048	10–25 W	Jan 12, 2021
Ryzen 5	5600U	6 (12)	2.3	4.2	16 MB	1 × 6	Radeon; Graphics	1.8	448:28:8; 7 CUs	1612.8	10–25 W	Jan 12, 2021
Ryzen 5	5560U	6 (12)	2.3	4.0	8 MB	1 × 6	Radeon; Graphics	1.6	384:24:8; 6 CUs	1228.8	10–25 W	Jan 12, 2021
Ryzen 3	5400U	4 (8)	2.7	4.1	8 MB	1 × 4	Radeon; Graphics	1.6	384:24:8; 6 CUs	1228.8	10–25 W	Jan 12, 2021

=== H ===
Branding and model		CPU					GPU				TDP	Release date
Branding and model		Cores (Threads)	Clock rate (GHz)		L3 cache (total)	Core config (Note: Core Complexes (CCX) × cores per CCX)	Model	Clock (GHz)	Config (Note: Unified shaders : texture mapping units : render output units and compute units (CU))	Processing power (GFLOPS) (Note: Single precision performance is calculated from the base (or boost) core clock speed based on a FMA operation.)	TDP	Release date
Branding and model		Cores (Threads)	Base	Boost	L3 cache (total)	Core config	Model	Clock (GHz)	Config	Processing power (GFLOPS)	TDP	Release date
Ryzen 9	5980HX	8 (16)	3.3	4.8	16 MB	1 × 8	Radeon; Graphics (Note: All of the iGPUs are branded as AMD Radeon Graphics.)	2.1	512:32:8; 8 CUs	2150.4	35–54 W	Jan 12, 2021
Ryzen 9	5980HS	8 (16)	3.0	4.8	16 MB	1 × 8	Radeon; Graphics	2.1	512:32:8; 8 CUs	2150.4	35 W	Jan 12, 2021
Ryzen 9	5900HX	8 (16)	3.3	4.6	16 MB	1 × 8	Radeon; Graphics	2.1	512:32:8; 8 CUs	2150.4	35–54 W	Jan 12, 2021
Ryzen 9	5900HS	8 (16)	3.0	4.6	16 MB	1 × 8	Radeon; Graphics	2.1	512:32:8; 8 CUs	2150.4	35 W	Jan 12, 2021
Ryzen 7	5800H	8 (16)	3.2	4.4	16 MB	1 × 8	Radeon; Graphics	2.0	512:32:8; 8 CUs	2048	35–54 W	Jan 12, 2021
Ryzen 7	5800HS	8 (16)	2.8	4.4	16 MB	1 × 8	Radeon; Graphics	2.0	512:32:8; 8 CUs	2048	35 W	Jan 12, 2021
Ryzen 5	5600H	6 (12)	3.3	4.2	16 MB	1 × 6	Radeon; Graphics	1.8	448:28:8; 7 CUs	1612.8	35–54 W	Jan 12, 2021
Ryzen 5	5600HS	6 (12)	3.0	4.2	16 MB	1 × 6	Radeon; Graphics	1.8	448:28:8; 7 CUs	1612.8	35 W	Jan 12, 2021

== "Barceló" (2022) ==
Branding and model		CPU					GPU				TDP	Release date
Branding and model		Cores (Threads)	Clock rate (GHz)		L3 cache (total)	Core config (Note: Core Complexes (CCX) × cores per CCX)	Model	Clock (GHz)	Config (Note: Unified shaders : texture mapping units : render output units and compute units (CU))	Processing power (GFLOPS) (Note: Single precision performance is calculated from the base (or boost) core clock speed based on a FMA operation.)	TDP	Release date
Branding and model		Cores (Threads)	Base	Boost	L3 cache (total)	Core config	Model	Clock (GHz)	Config	Processing power (GFLOPS)	TDP	Release date
Ryzen 7	5825U (Note: Model also available as Pro version as 5475U, 5675U, 5875U, released on April 19, 2022.) (Note: Model also available as Chromebook optimized version as 5425C, 5625C, 5825C, released on May 5, 2022.)	8 (16)	2.0	4.5	16 MB	1 × 8	Radeon; Graphics (Note: All of the iGPUs are branded as AMD Radeon Graphics.)	2.0	512:32:8; 8 CUs	2048	15 W	Jan 4, 2022
Ryzen 5	5625U	6 (12)	2.3	4.3	16 MB	1 × 6	Radeon; Graphics	1.8	448:28:8; 7 CUs	1612.8	15 W	Jan 4, 2022
Ryzen 3	5425U	4 (8)	2.7	4.1	8 MB	1 × 4	Radeon; Graphics	1.6	384:24:6; 6 CUs	?	15 W	Jan 30, 2022
Ryzen 3	5125C	2 (4)	3.0	—N/a	8 MB	1 × 2	Radeon; Graphics	?	192:12:8; 3 CU	?	15 W	May 5, 2022

== "Rembrandt" (2022) ==
Common features of Ryzen 6000 notebook APUs:

- Socket: FP7, FP7r2.
- All the CPUs support DDR5-4800 or LPDDR5-6400 in dual-channel mode.
- L1 cache: 64 KB (32 KB data + 32 KB instruction) per core.
- L2 cache: 512 KB per core.
- All the CPUs support 16 PCIe 4.0 lanes.
- Native USB 40Gbps (USB4) Ports: 2
- Native USB 10Gbps (USB 3.2 Gen 2 operation mode) Ports: 2
- Includes integrated RDNA 2 GPU.
- Fabrication process: TSMC N6 FinFET.

Branding and model		CPU					GPU				TDP	Release date
Branding and model		Cores (threads)	Clock (GHz)		L3 cache (total)	Core config (Note: Core Complexes (CCX) × cores per CCX)	Model	Clock (GHz)	Config (Note: Unified shaders : texture mapping units : render output units and compute units (CU))	Processing power (GFLOPS) (Note: Single precision performance is calculated from the base (or boost) core clock speed based on a FMA operation.)	TDP	Release date
Branding and model		Cores (threads)	Base	Boost	L3 cache (total)	Core config	Model	Clock (GHz)	Config	Processing power (GFLOPS)	TDP	Release date
Ryzen 9	6980HX	8 (16)	3.3	5.0	16 MB	1 × 8	680M	2.4	768:48:8; 12 CUs	3686	45 W	Jan 4, 2022
Ryzen 9	6980HS	8 (16)	3.3	5.0	16 MB	1 × 8	680M	2.4	768:48:8; 12 CUs	3686	35 W	Jan 4, 2022
Ryzen 9	6900HX (Note: Model also available as PRO version (6650U, 6650H, 6650HS, 6850U, 6850H, 6850HS, 6950H, 6950HS), released on April 19, 2022.)	8 (16)	3.3	4.9	16 MB	1 × 8	680M	2.4	768:48:8; 12 CUs	3686	45 W	Jan 4, 2022
Ryzen 9	6900HS	8 (16)	3.3	4.9	16 MB	1 × 8	680M	2.4	768:48:8; 12 CUs	3686	35 W	Jan 4, 2022
Ryzen 7	6800H	8 (16)	3.2	4.7	16 MB	1 × 8	680M	2.2	768:48:8; 12 CUs	3379	45 W	Jan 4, 2022
Ryzen 7	6800HS	8 (16)	3.2	4.7	16 MB	1 × 8	680M	2.2	768:48:8; 12 CUs	3379	35 W	Jan 4, 2022
Ryzen 7	6800U	8 (16)	2.7	4.7	16 MB	1 × 8	680M	2.2	768:48:8; 12 CUs	3379	15–28 W	Jan 4, 2022
Ryzen 5	6600H	6 (12)	3.3	4.5	16 MB	1 × 6	660M	1.9	384:24:8; 6 CUs	1459	45 W	Jan 4, 2022
Ryzen 5	6600HS	6 (12)	3.3	4.5	16 MB	1 × 6	660M	1.9	384:24:8; 6 CUs	1459	35 W	Jan 4, 2022
Ryzen 5	6600U	6 (12)	2.9	4.5	16 MB	1 × 6	660M	1.9	384:24:8; 6 CUs	1459	15–28 W	Jan 4, 2022

== Mendocino (7020 series, Zen2/RDNA2 based) ==
Common features of Ryzen 7020 notebook APUs:

- Socket: FT6
- All the CPUs support LPDDR5-5500 in dual-channel mode.
- L1 cache: 64 KB (32 KB data + 32 KB instruction) per core.
- L2 cache: 512 KB per core.
- All the CPUs support 4 PCIe 3.0 lanes.
- Native USB 40Gbps (USB4) Ports: 0
- Native USB 10Gbps (USB 3.2 Gen 2 operation mode) Ports: 1
- Includes integrated RDNA 2 GPU.
- Fabrication process: TSMC N6 FinFET.

Branding and Model		CPU					GPU			TDP	Release date
Branding and Model		Cores (threads)	Clock rate (GHz)		L3 cache (total)	Core config (Note: Core Complexes (CCX) × cores per CCX)	Model	Clock (GHz)	Processing power (Note: Single precision performance is calculated from the base (or boost) core clock speed based on a FMA operation.) (GFLOPS)	TDP	Release date
Branding and Model		Cores (threads)	Base	Boost	L3 cache (total)	Core config	Model	Clock (GHz)	Processing power (GFLOPS)	TDP	Release date
Ryzen 5	7520U (Note: Model also available as Chromebook optimized version as 7520C and 7320C released on May 23, 2023)	4 (8)	2.8	4.3	4 MB	1 × 4	610M; 2 CU	1.9	486	15 W	September 20, 2022
Ryzen 3	7320U	4 (8)	2.4	4.1	4 MB	1 × 4	610M; 2 CU	1.9	486	15 W	September 20, 2022

== Barcelo-R (7030 series, Zen3/GCN5 based) ==
Common features of Ryzen 7030 notebook APUs:

- Socket: FP6.
- All the CPUs support DDR4-3200 or LPDDR4-4266 in dual-channel mode.
- L1 cache: 64 KB (32 KB data + 32 KB instruction) per core.
- L2 cache: 512 KB per core.
- All the CPUs support 16 PCIe 3.0 lanes.
- Native USB 40Gbps (USB4) Ports: 0
- Native USB 10Gbps (USB 3.2 Gen 2 operation mode) Ports: 2
- Includes integrated GCN 5th generation GPU.
- Fabrication process: TSMC N7 FinFET.

Branding and Model		CPU					GPU			TDP	Release date
Branding and Model		Cores (threads)	Clock rate (GHz)		L3 cache (total)	Core config (Note: Core Complexes (CCX) × cores per CCX)	Model	Clock (GHz)	Processing power (Note: Single precision performance is calculated from the base (or boost) core clock speed based on a FMA operation.) (GFLOPS)	TDP	Release date
Branding and Model		Cores (threads)	Base	Boost	L3 cache (total)	Core config	Model	Clock (GHz)	Processing power (GFLOPS)	TDP	Release date
Ryzen 7	(PRO) 7730U	8 (16)	2.0	4.5	16 MB	1 × 8	Vega; 8 CU	2.0	2048	15 W	January 4, 2023
Ryzen 5	(PRO) 7530U	6 (12)	2.0	4.5	16 MB	1 × 6	Vega; 7 CU	2.0	1792	15 W	January 4, 2023
Ryzen 5	7430U	6 (12)	2.3	4.3	16 MB	1 × 6	Vega; 7 CU	1.8	1613	15 W	Q4 2023
Ryzen 3	(PRO) 7330U	4 (8)	2.3	4.3	8 MB	1 × 4	Vega; 6 CU	1.8	1382	15 W	January 4, 2023

== Rembrandt-R (7035 series, Zen3+/RDNA2 based) ==
Common features of Ryzen 7035 notebook APUs:

- Socket: FP7, FP7r2.
- All the CPUs support DDR5-4800 or LPDDR5-6400 in dual-channel mode.
- L1 cache: 64 KB (32 KB data + 32 KB instruction) per core.
- L2 cache: 512 KB per core.
- All the CPUs support 16 PCIe 4.0 lanes.
- Native USB 40Gbps (USB4) Ports: 2
- Native USB 10Gbps (USB 3.2 Gen 2 operation mode) Ports: 2
- Includes integrated RDNA 2 GPU.
- Fabrication process: TSMC N6 FinFET.

Branding and model		CPU					GPU			TDP	Release date
Branding and model		Cores (threads)	Clock (GHz)		L3 cache (total)	Core config (Note: Core Complexes (CCX) × cores per CCX)	Model	Clock (GHz)	Processing power (Note: Single precision performance is calculated from the base (or boost) core clock speed based on a FMA operation.) (GFLOPS)	TDP	Release date
Branding and model		Cores (threads)	Base	Boost	L3 cache (total)	Core config	Model	Clock (GHz)	Processing power (GFLOPS)	TDP	Release date
Ryzen 7	7735HS	8 (16)	3.2	4.75	16 MB	1 × 8	680M; 12 CU	2.2	3379	35–54 W	April 30, 2023
Ryzen 7	7735H	8 (16)	3.2	4.75	16 MB	1 × 8	680M; 12 CU	2.2	3379	35–54 W	April 30, 2023
Ryzen 7	7736U	8 (16)	2.7	4.7	16 MB	1 × 8	680M; 12 CU	2.2	3379	15–28 W	January 4, 2023
Ryzen 7	7735U	8 (16)	2.7	4.75	16 MB	1 × 8	680M; 12 CU	2.2	3379	15–30 W	January 4, 2023
Ryzen 7	7435HS	8 (16)	3.1	4.5	16 MB	1 × 8	—N/a			35–54 W	2024
Ryzen 7	7435H	8 (16)	3.1	4.5	16 MB	1 × 8	—N/a			35–54 W	2024
Ryzen 5	7535HS	6 (12)	3.3	4.55	16 MB	1 × 6	660M; 6 CU	1.9	1459	35–54 W	April 30, 2023
Ryzen 5	7535H	6 (12)	3.3	4.55	16 MB	1 × 6	660M; 6 CU	1.9	1459	35–54 W	April 30, 2023
Ryzen 5	7535U	6 (12)	2.9	4.55	16 MB	1 × 6	660M; 6 CU	1.9	1459	15–30 W	January 4, 2023
Ryzen 5	7235HS	4 (8)	3.2	4.2	8 MB	1 × 4	—N/a			35–53 W	2024
Ryzen 5	7235H	4 (8)	3.2	4.2	8 MB	1 × 4	—N/a			35–53 W	2024
Ryzen 3	7335U	4 (8)	3.0	4.3	8 MB	1 × 4	660M; 4 CU	1.8	922	15–30 W	January 4, 2023

== Phoenix (7040 series, Zen4/RDNA3 based) ==
Common features of Ryzen 7040 notebook APUs:

- Socket: FP7, FP7r2, FP8.
- All the CPUs support DDR5-5600 or LPDDR5X-7500 in dual-channel mode.
- L1 cache: 64 KB (32 KB data + 32 KB instruction) per core.
- L2 cache: 1 MB per core.
- All models support AVX-512 using a half-width 256-bit FPU.
- PCIe 4.0 support.
- Native USB 40Gbps (USB4) Ports: 2
- Native USB 10Gbps (USB 3.2 Gen 2 operation mode) Ports: 2
- Includes integrated RDNA 3 GPU.
- Some models include XDNA AI Engine (Ryzen AI) NPU capable of 10 TOPS.
- Fabrication process: TSMC N4 FinFET.

Branding and model		CPU							GPU		NPU (Ryzen AI)	TDP	Release date
Branding and model		Cores (threads)			Clock (GHz)		L3 cache (total)	Core config (Note: Core Complexes (CCX) × cores per CCX or Zen 4 + Zen 4c cores)	Model	Clock (GHz)	NPU (Ryzen AI)	TDP	Release date
Branding and model		Total	Zen 4	Zen 4c	Base	Boost	L3 cache (total)	Core config	Model	Clock (GHz)	NPU (Ryzen AI)	TDP	Release date
Ryzen 9	(PRO) 7940HS	8 (16)	8 (16)	—N/a	4.0	5.2	16 MB	1 × 8	780M; 12 CU	2.8	Yes; 10 TOPS	35-54 W	April 30, 2023 (Note: PRO versions launched on 13 June 2023.)
Ryzen 9	7940H (Note: China-only version of the HS SKU that lacks support for AMD EXPO and FreeSync technologies.)	8 (16)	8 (16)	—N/a	4.0	5.2	16 MB	1 × 8	780M; 12 CU	2.8	Yes; 10 TOPS	35-54 W	April 30, 2023
Ryzen 7	(PRO) 7840HS	8 (16)	8 (16)	—N/a	3.8	5.1	16 MB	1 × 8	780M; 12 CU	2.7	Yes; 10 TOPS	35-54 W	April 30, 2023
Ryzen 7	7840H	8 (16)	8 (16)	—N/a	3.8	5.1	16 MB	1 × 8	780M; 12 CU	2.7	Yes; 10 TOPS	35-54 W	April 30, 2023
Ryzen 7	(PRO) 7840U	8 (16)	8 (16)	—N/a	3.3	5.1	16 MB	1 × 8	780M; 12 CU	2.7	Yes; 10 TOPS	15-30 W	May 3, 2023
Ryzen 7	7445HS	6 (12)	2 (4)	4 (8)	3.2	4.7	16 MB	2 + 4	740M; 4 CU	2.7	No	20-40 W	May 3, 2023
Ryzen 5	(PRO) 7640HS	6 (12)	6 (12)	—N/a	4.3	5.0	16 MB	1 × 6	760M; 8 CU	2.6	Yes; 10 TOPS	35-54 W	April 30, 2023
Ryzen 5	7640H	6 (12)	6 (12)	—N/a	4.3	5.0	16 MB	1 × 6	760M; 8 CU	2.6	Yes; 10 TOPS	35-54 W	April 30, 2023
Ryzen 5	(PRO) 7640U	6 (12)	6 (12)	—N/a	3.5	4.9	16 MB	1 × 6	760M; 8 CU	2.6	Yes; 10 TOPS	15-30 W	May 3, 2023
Ryzen 5	(PRO) 7545U	6 (12)	2 (4)	4 (8)	3.7 / 3.0 (Note: Zen 4 cores' base frequency / Zen 4c cores' base frequency)	4.9 / 3.5 (Note: Zen 4 cores' boost frequency / Zen 4c cores' boost frequency)	16 MB	2 + 4	740M; 4 CU	2.8	No	15-30 W	November 2, 2023
Ryzen 5	(PRO) 7540U	6 (12)	6 (12)	—N/a	3.2	4.9	16 MB	1 × 6	740M; 4 CU	2.5	No	15-30 W	May 3, 2023
Ryzen 3	7440U	4 (8)	1 (2)	3 (6)	3.6 / 2.8	4.7 / 3.3	8 MB	1 + 3	740M; 4 CU	2.5	No	15-30 W	May 3, 2023

== Dragon Range (7045 series, Zen4/RDNA2 based) ==
Common features of Ryzen 7045 notebook CPUs:

- Socket: FL1.
- All the CPUs support DDR5-5200 in dual-channel mode.
- L1 cache: 64 KB (32 KB data + 32 KB instruction) per core.
- L2 cache: 1 MB per core.
- All the CPUs support 28 PCIe 5.0 lanes.
- Native USB 40Gbps (USB4) Ports: 0
- Native USB 10Gbps (USB 3.2 Gen 2 operation mode) Ports: 4
- Includes integrated RDNA 2 GPU on the I/O die with 2 CUs and clock speeds of 400 MHz (base), 2.2 GHz (boost) (Note: Self identifies as "AMD Radeon 610M". See RDNA 2 § Integrated graphics processors (iGPs).).
- Fabrication process: TSMC N5 FinFET (N6 FinFET for the I/O and graphics die).

Branding and model		Cores (threads)	Clock (GHz)		L3 cache (total)	Chiplets	Core config (Note: Core Complexes (CCX) × cores per CCX)	TDP	Release date
Branding and model		Cores (threads)	Base	Boost	L3 cache (total)	Chiplets	Core config	TDP	Release date
Ryzen 9	7945HX3D	16 (32)	2.3	5.4	128 MB (Note: Only one of the two CCXes has additional 64 MB of 3D V-Cache. Only the CCX without 3D V-Cache will be able to reach the maximum boost clocks. The CCX with 3D V-Cache will clock lower.)	2 × CCD; 1 × I/OD	2 × 8	55–75 W	July 27, 2023
Ryzen 9	7945HX	16 (32)	2.5	5.4	64 MB	2 × CCD; 1 × I/OD	2 × 8	55–75 W	February 28, 2023
Ryzen 9	7940HX	16 (32)	2.4	5.2	64 MB	2 × CCD; 1 × I/OD	2 × 8	55–75 W	January 17, 2024
Ryzen 9	7845HX	12 (24)	3.0	5.2	64 MB	2 × CCD; 1 × I/OD	2 × 6	45–75 W	February 28, 2023
Ryzen 7	7840HX	12 (24)	2.9	5.1	64 MB	2 × CCD; 1 × I/OD	2 × 6	45–75 W	January 17, 2024
Ryzen 7	7745HX	8 (16)	3.6	5.1	32 MB	1 × CCD; 1 × I/OD	1 × 8	45–75 W	February 28, 2023
Ryzen 5	7645HX	6 (12)	4.0	5.0	32 MB	1 × CCD; 1 × I/OD	1 × 6	45–75 W	February 28, 2023

== Hawk Point (8040 series, Zen 4/RDNA3/XDNA based) ==
Key features of Ryzen 8040 notebook APUs:

- Socket: BGA (FP7, FP7r2 or FP8 type packages).
- All models support DDR5-5600 or LPDDR5X-7500 in dual-channel mode.
- CPU uses Zen4 cores (Phoenix) or a combination of Zen4 and Zen4c cores (Phoenix2).
- GPU uses the RDNA 3 (Navi 3) architecture.
- Some models include first-generation Ryzen AI NPU (XDNA) capable of 16 TOPS.
- All models support AVX-512 using a half-width 256-bit FPU.
- PCIe 4.0 support.
- Native USB 40Gbps (USB4) Ports: 2
- Native USB 10Gbps (USB 3.2 Gen 2 operation mode) Ports: 2
- Fabrication process: TSMC N4 FinFET.

Branding and model		CPU							GPU		NPU (Ryzen AI)	TDP	Release date
Branding and model		Cores (threads)			Clock (GHz)		L3 cache (total)	Core config (Note: Core Complexes (CCX) × cores per CCX or Zen 4 + Zen 4c cores)	Model	Clock (GHz)	NPU (Ryzen AI)	TDP	Release date
Branding and model		Total	Zen 4	Zen 4c	Base	Boost	L3 cache (total)	Core config	Model	Clock (GHz)	NPU (Ryzen AI)	TDP	Release date
Ryzen 9	8945HS	8 (16)	8 (16)	—	4.0	5.2	16 MB	1 × 8	780M 12 CU	2.8	Yes; 16 TOPS	35-54 W	December 6, 2023
Ryzen 7	8845HS	8 (16)	8 (16)	—	3.8	5.1	16 MB	1 × 8	780M 12 CU	2.7	Yes; 16 TOPS	35-54 W	December 6, 2023
Ryzen 7	8840HS	8 (16)	8 (16)	—	3.3	5.1	16 MB	1 × 8	780M 12 CU	2.7	Yes; 16 TOPS	20-30 W	December 6, 2023
Ryzen 7	8840U	8 (16)	8 (16)	—	3.3	5.1	16 MB	1 × 8	780M 12 CU	2.7	Yes; 16 TOPS	15-30 W	December 6, 2023
Ryzen 7	8745HS	8 (16)	8 (16)	—	3.8	4.9	16 MB	1 × 8	780M 12 CU	2.6	No	35–54 W	?
Ryzen 7	8745H	8 (16)	8 (16)	—	3.8	4.9	16 MB	1 × 8	780M 12 CU	2.6	No	35–54 W	?
Ryzen 5	8645HS	6 (12)	6 (12)	—	4.3	5.0	16 MB	1 × 6	760M 8 CU	2.6	Yes; 16 TOPS	35-54 W	December 6, 2023
Ryzen 5	8640HS	6 (12)	6 (12)	—	3.5	4.9	16 MB	1 × 6	760M 8 CU	2.6	Yes; 16 TOPS	20-30 W	December 6, 2023
Ryzen 5	8640U	6 (12)	6 (12)	—	3.5	4.9	16 MB	1 × 6	760M 8 CU	2.6	Yes; 16 TOPS	15-30 W	December 6, 2023
Ryzen 5	8540U	6 (12)	2 (4)	4 (8)	3.7 / 3.0 (Note: Zen 4 cores' base frequency / Zen 4c cores' base frequency)	4.9 / 3.5 (Note: Zen 4 cores' boost frequency / Zen 4c cores' boost frequency)	16 MB	2 + 4	740M 4 CU	2.8	No	15-30 W	?
Ryzen 3	8440U	4 (8)	1 (2)	3 (6)	3.6 / 2.8	4.7 / 3.3	8 MB	1 + 3	740M 4 CU	2.5	No	15-30 W	?

== Ryzen 10 Series ==
=== Mendocino (10 series, Zen 2/RDNA2 based) ===
Common features of Ryzen 10 notebook APUs:

- Socket: FT6
- All the CPUs support LPDDR5-5500 in dual-channel mode.
- L1 cache: 64 KB (32 KB data + 32 KB instruction) per core.
- L2 cache: 512 KB per core.
- All the CPUs support 4 PCIe 3.0 lanes.
- Native USB 40Gbps (USB4) Ports: 0
- Native USB 10Gbps (USB 3.2 Gen 2 operation mode) Ports: 1
- Includes integrated RDNA 2 GPU.
- Fabrication process: TSMC N6 FinFET.

Branding and Model		CPU					GPU			TDP	Release date
Branding and Model		Cores (threads)	Clock rate (GHz)		L3 cache (total)	Core config (Note: Core Complexes (CCX) × cores per CCX)	Model	Clock (GHz)	Processing power (GFLOPS)	TDP	Release date
Branding and Model		Cores (threads)	Base	Boost	L3 cache (total)	Core config	Model	Clock (GHz)	Processing power (GFLOPS)	TDP	Release date
Ryzen 5	40	4 (8)	2.8	4.3	4 MB	1 × 4	610M; 2 CU	1.9	486	15 W	October 1, 2025
Ryzen 3	30	4 (8)	2.4	4.1	4 MB	1 × 4	610M; 2 CU	1.9	486	15 W	October 1, 2025

== Ryzen 100 series ==
=== Rembrandt-R (100 series, Zen 3+/RDNA2 based) ===
Common features of Ryzen 100 notebook APUs:

- Socket: FP7, FP7r2.
- All the CPUs support DDR5-4800 or LPDDR5-6400 in dual-channel mode.
- L1 cache: 64 KB (32 KB data + 32 KB instruction) per core.
- L2 cache: 512 KB per core.
- All the CPUs support 16 PCIe 4.0 lanes.
- Native USB 40Gbps (USB4) Ports: 0
- Native USB 10Gbps (USB 3.2 Gen 2 operation mode) Ports: 2
- Includes integrated RDNA 2 GPU.
- Fabrication process: TSMC N6 FinFET.

Branding and model		CPU					GPU			TDP (cTDP)	Release date
Branding and model		Cores (threads)	Clock (GHz)		L3 cache (total)	Core config (Note: Core Complexes (CCX) × cores per CCX)	Model	Clock (GHz)	Processing power (Note: Single precision performance is calculated from the base (or boost) core clock speed based on a FMA operation.) (GFLOPS)	TDP (cTDP)	Release date
Branding and model		Cores (threads)	Base	Boost	L3 cache (total)	Core config	Model	Clock (GHz)	Processing power (GFLOPS)	TDP (cTDP)	Release date
Ryzen 7	170	8 (16)	3.2	4.75	16 MB	1 × 8	680M; 12 CU	2.2	3379	45 W (35–54 W)	October 1, 2025
Ryzen 7	160	8 (16)	2.7	4.75	16 MB	1 × 8	680M; 12 CU	2.2	3379	28 W (15–30 W)	October 1, 2025
Ryzen 5	150	6 (12)	3.3	4.55	16 MB	1 × 6	660M; 6 CU	1.9	1459	45 W (35–54 W)	October 1, 2025
Ryzen 5	130	6 (12)	2.9	4.55	16 MB	1 × 6	660M; 6 CU	1.9	1459	28 W (15–30 W)	October 1, 2025
Ryzen 3	110	4 (8)	3.0	4.3	8 MB	1 × 4	660M; 4 CU	1.8	922	28 W (15–30 W)	October 1, 2025

=== Hawk Point (100 series, Zen 4/RDNA3 based) ===
Branding and model		CPU					GPU		NPU (Ryzen AI)	TDP (cTDP)	Release date
Branding and model		Cores (threads)	Clock (GHz)		L3 cache (total)	Core config (Note: Core Complexes (CCX) × cores per CCX)	Model	Clock (GHz)	NPU (Ryzen AI)	TDP (cTDP)	Release date
Branding and model		Cores (threads)	Base	Boost	L3 cache (total)	Core config	Model	Clock (GHz)	NPU (Ryzen AI)	TDP (cTDP)	Release date
Ryzen 9	180	8 (16)	3.6	4.9	16 MB	1 × 8	780M 12 CU	2.5	Yes 16 TOPS	45 W (35−54 W)	June 2, 2026
Ryzen 7	165	6 (12)	3.3	4.7	16 MB	1 × 6	760M 8 CU	2.4	Yes 16 TOPS	28 W (15−30 W)	June 2, 2026
Ryzen 7	155	6 (12)	3.0	4.7	16 MB	1 × 6	740M 4 CU	2.6	No	35 W (15−40 W)	June 2, 2026
Ryzen 5	125	4 (8)	2.8	4.5	8 MB	1 × 4	740M 4 CU	2.3	No	28 W (15−40 W)	June 2, 2026

== Ryzen 200 series ==
=== Hawk Point Refresh (200 series, Zen 4/RDNA3/XDNA based) ===
Branding and Model		CPU							GPU			Ryzen AI	TDP	Release date
Branding and Model		Cores (threads)			Clock (GHz)		L3 cache (total)	Core config	Model	Clock (GHz)	Processing power	Ryzen AI	TDP	Release date
Branding and Model		Total	Zen 4	Zen 4c	Base	Boost	L3 cache (total)	Core config	Model	Clock (GHz)	Processing power	Ryzen AI	TDP	Release date
Branding and Model		Total	Zen 4	Zen 4c	Base	Boost	L3 cache (total)	Core config	Model	Clock (GHz)	Single （GFLOPS）	Ryzen AI	TDP	Release date
Ryzen 9	270	8 (16)	8 (16)	-	4.0	5.2	16 MB	1 × 8	780M; 12 CU	2.8	4300.8	Yes	35–54 W	February 18, 2025
Ryzen 7	260	8 (16)	8 (16)	-	3.8	5.1	16 MB	1 × 8	780M; 12 CU	2.7	4147.2	Yes	35–54 W	February 18, 2025
Ryzen 7	(PRO) 253	8 (16)	8 (16)	-	3.6	4.9	16 MB	1 × 8	780M; 12 CU	2.5	3840	Yes	35–54 W	June 2, 2026
Ryzen 7	(PRO) 250	8 (16)	8 (16)	-	3.3	5.1	16 MB	1 × 8	780M; 12 CU	2.7	4147.2	Yes	15–30 W	February 18, 2025
Ryzen 7	(PRO) 249	8 (16)	8 (16)	-	3.1	4.9	16 MB	1 × 8	780M; 12 CU	2.5	3840	No	15–30 W	June 2, 2026
Ryzen 7	(PRO) 217	6 (12)	2 (4)	4 (8)	3.0	4.8	16 MB	2 + 4	740M; 4 CU	2.6	1331.2	No	15–40 W	June 2, 2026
Ryzen 5	240	6 (12)	6 (12)	-	4.3	5.0	16 MB	1 × 6	760M; 8 CU	2.6	2662.4	Yes	35–54 W	February 18, 2025
Ryzen 5	(PRO) 230	6 (12)	6 (12)	-	3.5	4.9	16 MB	1 × 6	760M; 8 CU	2.6	2662.4	Yes	15–30 W	February 18, 2025
Ryzen 5	(PRO) 225	6 (12)	6 (12)	-	3.3	4.8	16 MB	1 × 6	760M; 8 CU	2.4	2457.6	Yes	35–54W	June 2, 2026
Ryzen 5	(PRO) 224	6 (12)	6 (12)	-	3.3 / 3.1	4.8	16 MB	1 × 6	760M; 8 CU	2.4	2457.6	No	15–30W	June 2, 2026
Ryzen 5	(PRO) 220	6 (12)	2 (4)	4 (8)	3.7 / 3.0	4.9 / 3.5	16 MB	2 + 4	740M; 4 CU	2.8	1433.6	No	15–30W	February 18, 2025
Ryzen 5	(PRO) 216	6 (12)	2 (4)	4 (8)	2.9	4.7	16 MB	2 + 4	740M; 4 CU	2.5	1280	No	15–40W	June 2, 2026
Ryzen 5	PRO 215	6 (12)	2 (4)	4 (8)	3.2 / 3.2	4.7 / 3.5	16 MB	2 + 4	740M; 4 CU	2.7	1382.4	No	15–30W	March 27, 2025
Ryzen 3	(PRO) 210	4 (8)	1 (2)	3 (6)	3.6 / 2.8	4.7 / 3.3	8 MB	1 + 3	740M; 4 CU	2.5	1280	No	15–30W	February 18, 2025
Ryzen 3	(PRO) 205	6 (12)	2 (4)	4 (8)	2.8	4.6	8 MB	2 + 4	740M; 4 CU	2.3	1177.6	No	15–40W	June 2, 2026

== Ryzen AI 300 series ==
=== Strix Point and Krackan Point (Zen 5/RDNA3.5/XDNA2 based) ===
Common features of Ryzen AI 300 notebook APUs:

- Socket: BGA, FP8 package type.
- All models support DDR5-5600 or LPDDR5X-8000 in dual-channel mode.
- All models support 16 PCIe 4.0 lanes.
- Native USB 40Gbps (USB4) Ports: 2
- Native USB 10Gbps (USB 3.2 Gen 2 operation mode) Ports: 2
- iGPU uses the RDNA 3.5 microarchitecture.
- NPU uses the XDNA 2 AI Engine (Ryzen AI).
- Both Zen 5 and Zen 5c cores support AVX-512 using a half-width 256-bit FPU.
- L1 cache: 80 KB (48 KB data + 32 KB instruction) per core.
- L2 cache: 1 MB per core.
- Fabrication process: TSMC N4P FinFET.

Branding and model		CPU							GPU		NPU (Ryzen AI)	TDP (cTDP)	Release date
Branding and model		Cores (threads)			Clock (GHz)			L3 cache (total)	Model	Clock (GHz)	NPU (Ryzen AI)	TDP (cTDP)	Release date
Branding and model		Total	Zen 5	Zen 5c	Base	Boost (Zen 5)	Boost (Zen 5c)	L3 cache (total)	Model	Clock (GHz)	NPU (Ryzen AI)	TDP (cTDP)	Release date
Ryzen AI 9	(PRO) HX 375	12 (24)	4 (8)	8 (16)	2.0	5.1	3.3	24 MB	890M; 16 CUs	2.9	55 TOPS	28 W (15−54 W)	June 2, 2024
Ryzen AI 9	(PRO) HX 370	12 (24)	4 (8)	8 (16)	2.0	5.1	3.3	24 MB	890M; 16 CUs	2.9	50 TOPS	28 W (15−54 W)	June 2, 2024
Ryzen AI 9	365	10 (20)	4 (8)	6 (12)	2.0	5.0	3.3	24 MB	880M; 12 CUs	2.9	50 TOPS	28 W (15−54 W)	June 2, 2024
Ryzen AI 7	PRO 360	8 (16)	3 (6)	5 (10)	2.0	5.0	3.3	16 MB	880M; 12 CUs	2.9	50 TOPS	28 W (15−54 W)	October 10, 2024
Ryzen AI 7	(PRO) 350	8 (16)	4 (8)	4 (8)	2.0	5.0	3.5	16 MB	860M; 8 CU	3.0	50 TOPS	28 W (15−54 W)	(March 27, 2025) February 18, 2025
Ryzen AI 5	(PRO) 340	6 (12)	3 (6)	3 (6)	2.0	4.8	3.4	16 MB	840M; 4 CU	2.9	50 TOPS	28 W (15−54 W)	(March 27, 2025) February 18, 2025
Ryzen AI 5	330	4 (8)	1 (2)	3 (6)	2.0	4.5	3.4	8 MB	820M; 2 CU	2.8	50 TOPS	28 W (15−28 W)	July 2025

== Ryzen AI 400 series ==
=== Gorgon Point (Zen 5/RDNA3.5/XDNA2 based) ===
Common features of Ryzen AI 400 notebook APUs:

- Socket: BGA, FP8 package type.
- All models support DDR5-5600 or LPDDR5X-8000 (LPDDR5X-8533 for 440, 450, 465, 470, 475 series) in dual-channel mode.
- All models support 16 PCIe 4.0 lanes.
- Native USB 40Gbps (USB4) Ports: 2
- Native USB 10Gbps (USB 3.2 Gen 2 operation mode) Ports: 2
- iGPU uses the RDNA 3.5 microarchitecture.
- NPU uses the XDNA 2 AI Engine (Ryzen AI).
- Both Zen 5 and Zen 5c cores support AVX-512 using a half-width 256-bit FPU.
- L1 cache: 80 KB (48 KB data + 32 KB instruction) per core.
- L2 cache: 1 MB per core.
- Fabrication process: TSMC N4P FinFET.

Branding and model		CPU							GPU		NPU (Ryzen AI)	TDP	Release date
Branding and model		Cores (threads)			Clock (GHz)			L3 cache (total)	Model	Clock (GHz)	NPU (Ryzen AI)	TDP	Release date
Branding and model		Total	Zen 5	Zen 5c	Base	Boost (Zen 5)	Boost (Zen 5c)	L3 cache (total)	Model	Clock (GHz)	NPU (Ryzen AI)	TDP	Release date
Ryzen AI 9	(PRO) HX 475	12 (24)	4 (8)	8 (16)	2.0	5.2	3.3	24 MB	890M; 16 CUs	3.1	60 TOPS	15–54 W	January 5, 2026
Ryzen AI 9	(PRO) HX 470	12 (24)	4 (8)	8 (16)	2.0	5.2	3.3	24 MB	890M; 16 CUs	3.1	55 TOPS	15–54 W	January 5, 2026
Ryzen AI 9	(PRO) 465 (Note: Model also available as "H" version as H 430, H 435, H PRO 435, H PRO 440, H 445, H PRO 445, H 450, H PRO 450, H 465, and H PRO 465, but lacks support for AMD EXPO and FreeSync technologies.)	10 (20)	4 (8)	6 (12)	2.0	5.0	3.3	24 MB	880M; 12 CUs	2.9	50 TOPS	15–54 W	January 5, 2026
Ryzen AI 7	(PRO) 450	8 (16)	4 (8)	4 (8)	2.0	5.1	3.6	16 MB	860M; 8 CUs	3.1	50 TOPS	15–54 W	January 5, 2026
Ryzen AI 7	445	6 (12)	2 (4)	4 (8)	2.0	4.6	3.5	8 MB	840M; 4 CUs	2.9	50 TOPS	15–54 W	January 5, 2026
Ryzen AI 5	PRO 440	6 (12)	3 (6)	3 (6)	2.0	4.8	3.5	16 MB	840M; 4 CUs	2.9	50 TOPS	15–54 W	January 5, 2026
Ryzen AI 5	(PRO) 435	6 (12)	2 (4)	4 (8)	2.0	4.5	3.4	8 MB	840M; 4 CUs	2.8	50 TOPS	15–54 W	January 5, 2026
Ryzen AI 5	430	4 (8)	1 (2)	3 (6)	2.0	4.5	3.4	8 MB	840M; 4 CUs	2.8	50 TOPS	15–28 W	January 5, 2026

== See also ==
- List of AMD processors
- List of AMD Ryzen processors
- List of AMD processors with 3D graphics
