= Memory divider =

Ratio used in computer memory

A memory divider is a ratio which is used to determine the operating clock frequency of computer memory in accordance with front side bus (FSB) frequency, if the memory system is dependent on FSB clock speed. Along with memory latency timings, memory dividers are extensively used in overclocking memory subsystems to find stable, working memory states at higher FSB frequencies. The ratio between DRAM and FSB is commonly referred to as "DRAM:FSB ratio".

Memory dividers are only applicable to those chipsets in which memory speed is dependent on FSB speeds. Certain chipsets like nVidia 680i have separate memory and FSB lanes due to which memory clock and FSB clock are asynchronous and memory dividers are not used there. Setting memory speeds and overclocking memory systems in such chipsets are different issues which do not use memory dividers. This article is only applicable to those chipsets in which the memory clock is dependent on FSB clock.

== Overview ==
Memory Dividers allow system memory to run slower than or faster than the actual FSB (Front Side Bus) speed. Ideally, Front Side Bus and system memory should run at the same clock speed because FSB connects system memory to the CPU, but it is sometimes desired to run the FSB and system memory at different clock speeds. It is possible to run FSB and memory clock at different clock speeds, within certain limits of the motherboard and corresponding chipset. So, settings termed as Memory Divider or FSB/DRAM settings are available and are expressed in a "ratio" which control the difference in memory clock rate and FSB speed.

Entry Level motherboards usually do not provide memory dividers to be changed and the memory dividers are managed by Memory Controller (if chipset supports memory dividers). High end motherboards meant for overclocking provide facilities to change memory dividers (if chipset supports memory dividers). However, in certain chipsets memory dividers are not used, because in those systems memory speed is independent of FSB speed.

== Description and application ==
Usually (Memory Divider) × (Front Side Bus Frequency) gives I/O Bus clock of the memory. Memory clock then determines the final operating frequency or effective clock speed of memory system depending upon DRAM types (DDR, DDR2 and DDR3 SDRAM).

By default, FSB speed and memory are usually set to a 1:1 ratio, meaning that increasing FSB speed (by overclocking) increases memory speed by the same amount. Normally system memory is not built for overclocking and thus may not be able to take the level of overclocking that the processor or motherboard can achieve. The memory divider allows users to mitigate this problem by reducing the speed increase of the memory relative to that of the FSB and the processor.

== Example ==
Suppose a computer system has DDR memory, a Memory Divider of 1:1, an FSB operating at 200 MHz and a CPU multiplier of 10x. Then, the base memory clock will operate at (Memory Divider) × (FSB) = 1 × 200 = 200 MHz and the effective memory clock would be 400 MHz since it is a DDR system ("DDR" stands for Double Data Rate; the effective memory clock speed is double the actual clock speed). The CPU will operate at 10 × 200 MHz = 2.0 GHz. Using I/O bus frequency of 200 MHz various types of DRAM will operate as:

DDR SDRAM at  400 MHz (DDR-400 or PC-3200)
DDR2 SDRAM at  800 MHz (DDR2-800 or PC2-6400)
DDR3 SDRAM at  1600 MHz (DDR3-1600 or PC3-12800)

Now suppose that we overclock FSB to 250 MHz so that CPU operates at 10 × 250 MHz = 2.5 GHz and memory clock operates at 250 MHz (Memory Divider × FSB). Since DDR-400 RAM is used then effective memory clock (Actual Memory Frequency) will be 500 MHz. A normal DDR-400 SDRAM will fail to work at 500 MHz since it is designed to work at 400 MHz and system will become unstable. But a modern CPU (having overclocking potential) can work at 2.5 GHz (even if it is designed to work at 2 GHz) flawlessly without giving any problem of stability. To keep running overclocked CPU at 2.5 GHz or even at higher speeds (by increasing FSB) we need to slow down memory clock so as to achieve a stable system. For this if we decrease DRAM:FSB ratio to say 4:5 then resulting memory clock speed is (4/5) × 250 MHz = 200 MHz resulting effective clock speed of 400 MHz on DDR-400. So, we are able to operate upon a stable overclocked CPU at 2.5 GHz from 2 GHz without increasing effective memory clock.

== See also ==
- CPU multiplier
