= Zen+ =

2018 AMD 12-nanometre processor microarchitecture

AMD Zen+
General information
- Launched: April 2018
- Designed by: AMD
- Common manufacturer: GlobalFoundries
- CPUID code: Family 17h

Physical specifications
- Transistors: 4.8 billion per 8-core "Zeppelin" die
- Cores: 4–6 (mainstream); 8 (performance); 12–32 (enthusiast)
- Sockets: Socket AM4; Socket TR4

Cache
- L1 cache: 64 KB instruction, 32 KB data per core
- L2 cache: 512 KB per core
- L3 cache: 8 MB per CCX (APU: 4 MB)

Architecture and classification
- Technology node: 12 nm (FinFET)
- Microarchitecture: Zen
- Instruction set: AMD64 (x86-64)
- Extensions: Crypto AES, SHA; SIMD MMX-plus, SSE, SSE2, SSE3, SSSE3, SSE4.1, SSE4.2, SSE4A, FMA3, AVX, AVX2

Products, models, variants
- Product code names: Pinnacle Ridge (Desktop); Colfax (HEDT); Picasso (APU/Embedded)
- Brand names: Ryzen; Ryzen Threadripper; Athlon

History
- Predecessor: Zen (1st gen)
- Successor: Zen 2

Support status
- Supported

Zen+ is the name for a computer processor microarchitecture by AMD. It is the successor to the first gen Zen microarchitecture, and was first released in April 2018, powering the second generation of Ryzen processors, known as Ryzen 2000 for mainstream desktop systems, Threadripper 2000 for high-end desktop setups and Ryzen 3000G (instead of 2000G) for accelerated processing units (APUs).

== Features ==
Die shot of Ryzen 5-2600

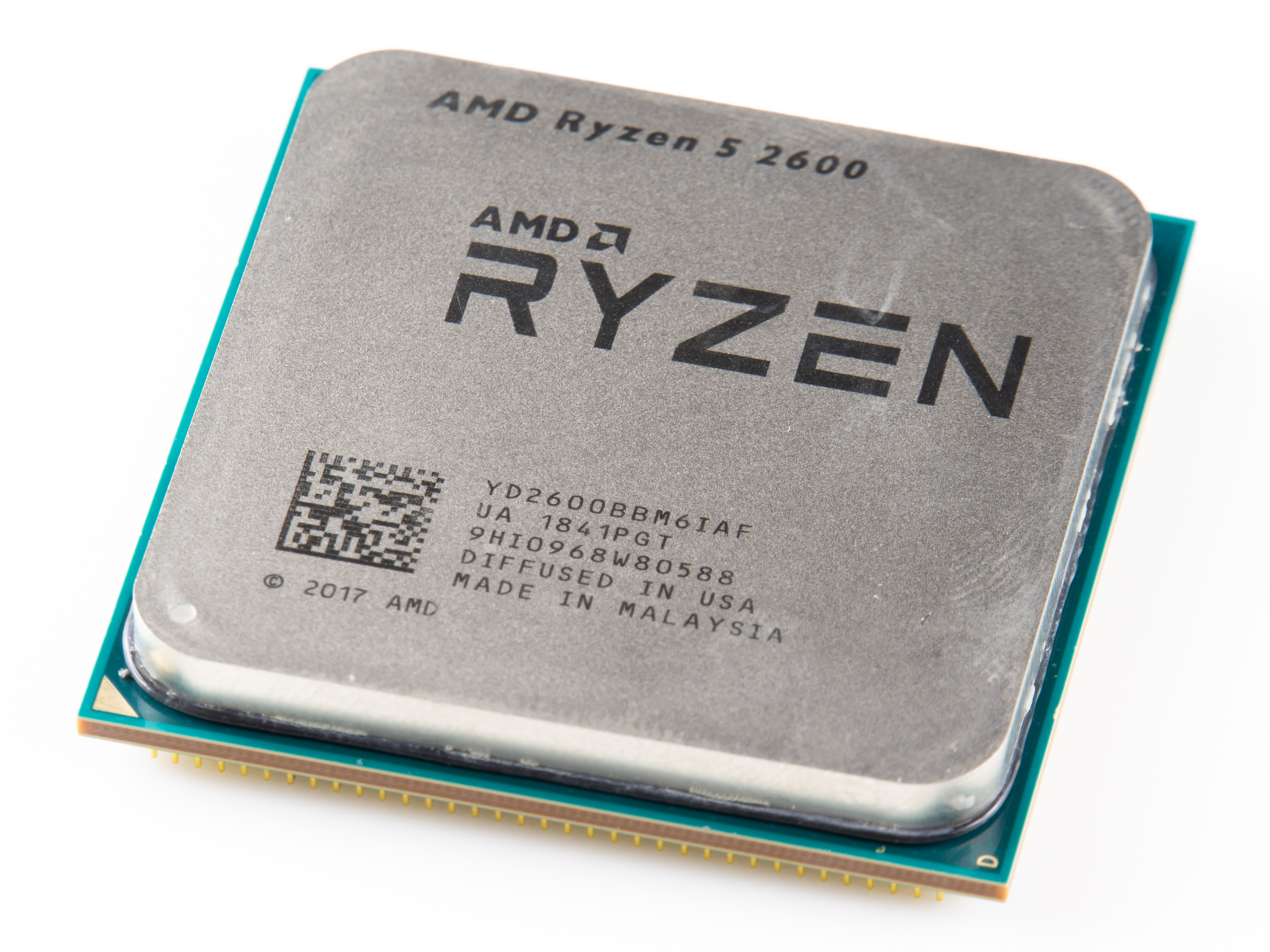
An AMD Ryzen 5 2600

Zen+ uses GlobalFoundries' 12 nm fabrication process, an optimization of the 14 nm process used for Zen, with only minor design rule changes. This means that the die sizes between Zen and Zen+ are identical as AMD chose to use the new smaller transistors to increase the amount of empty space, or "dark silicon", between the various features on the die. This was done to improve power efficiency & reduce thermal density to allow for higher clock speeds, rather than design an entirely new floorplan for a physically smaller die (which would have been significantly more work and thus more expensive). These process optimizations allowed 12 nm Zen+ to clock about +250 MHz (≈6%) higher, or to lower power consumption when at the same frequency by 10%, when compared to their prior 14 nm Zen products. Although conversely at the microarchitecture level, Zen+ had only minor revisions versus Zen. Known changes to the microarchitecture include improved clock speed regulation in response to workload ("Precision Boost 2"), reduced cache and memory latencies (some significantly so), increased cache bandwidth, and finally improved IMC performance allowing for better DDR4 memory support (officially JEDEC rated to support up to 2933 MHz compared to just 2666 MHz on the prior Zen core), and fixed many hardware bugs found on Zen 1, such as fTPM / PSP bugs on Zen 1, and SVM / SLAT bugs on Zen 1.

Zen+ also supports improvements in the per-core clocking features, based on core utilization and CPU temperatures. These changes to the core utilization, temperature, and power algorithms are branded as "Precision Boost 2" and "XFR2" ("eXtended Frequency Range 2"), evolutions of the first-generation technologies in Zen. On Zen, XFR gave an additional 50 to 200 MHz clock speed increase (in 25 MHz increments) over the maximum Precision Boost clocks. For Zen+, XFR2 is no longer listed as a separate clock modifier. Instead, the XFR temperature, power, and clock monitoring and logic feeds into the Precision Boost 2 algorithm to adjust clocks and power consumption opportunistically and dynamically.

Ultimately, the changes in Zen+ resulted in a 3% improvement in IPC over Zen; which in conjunction with 6% higher clock speeds resulted in up to 10% overall increase in performance.

== Feature tables ==
=== APUs ===
APU features table

== Products ==
=== Desktop CPUs ===
Common features of Ryzen 2000 desktop CPUs:

- Socket: AM4.
- All the CPUs support DDR4-2933 in dual-channel mode, except for R7 2700E, R5 2600E, R5 1600AF and R3 1200AF which support it at DDR4-2666 speeds.
- All the CPUs support 24 PCIe 3.0 lanes. 4 of the lanes are reserved as link to the chipset.
- No integrated graphics.
- L1 cache: 96 KB (32 KB data + 64 KB instruction) per core.
- L2 cache: 512 KB per core.
- Fabrication process: GlobalFoundries 12LP (14LP+).

Branding and Model		Cores (threads)	Clock rate (GHz)		L3 cache (total)	TDP	Core config (Note: Core Complexes (CCX) × cores per CCX)	Thermal Solution	Release date	Launch price (Note: Manufacturer suggested retail price at launch)
Branding and Model		Cores (threads)	Base	PB2	L3 cache (total)	TDP	Core config	Thermal Solution	Release date	Launch price
Ryzen 7	2700X (Note: Model also available as PRO version as 2600, 2700, 2700X, released on September 19, 2018.)	8 (16)	3.7	4.3	16 MB	105 W	2 × 4	Wraith Prism	April 19, 2018	US $329
Ryzen 7	2700	8 (16)	3.2	4.1	16 MB	65 W	2 × 4	Wraith Spire	April 19, 2018	US $299
Ryzen 7	2700E	8 (16)	2.8	4.0	16 MB	45 W	2 × 4	—N/a	September 19, 2018	OEM
Ryzen 5	2600X	6 (12)	3.6	4.2	16 MB	95 W	2 × 3	Wraith Spire	April 19, 2018	US $229
Ryzen 5	2600	6 (12)	3.4	3.9	16 MB	65 W	2 × 3	Wraith Stealth	April 19, 2018	US $199
Ryzen 5	2600E	6 (12)	3.1	4.0	16 MB	45 W	2 × 3	—N/a	September 19, 2018	OEM
Ryzen 5	1600 (AF) (Note: AF models are 12 nm Zen+ refresh of 14 nm Zen models (1200 and 1600 with "AF" instead of "AE" in the part numbers). AMD officially considers these CPUs as part of the 1000 Series.)	6 (12)	3.2	3.6	16 MB	65 W	2 × 3	Wraith Stealth	October 11, 2019	US $85
Ryzen 5	2500X	4 (8)	3.6	4.0	8 MB	65 W	1 × 4	—N/a	September 10, 2018	OEM
Ryzen 3	2300X	4 (4)	3.5	4.0	8 MB	65 W	1 × 4	—N/a	September 10, 2018	OEM
Ryzen 3	1200 (AF)	4 (4)	3.1	3.4	8 MB	65 W	1 × 4	Wraith Stealth	April 21, 2020	US $60

Common features of Ryzen 2000 HEDT CPUs:

- Socket: TR4.
- All the CPUs support DDR4-2933 in quad-channel mode.
- All the CPUs support 64 PCIe 3.0 lanes. 4 of the lanes are reserved as link to the chipset.
- No integrated graphics.
- L1 cache: 96 KB (32 KB data + 64 KB instruction) per core.
- L2 cache: 512 KB per core.
- Fabrication process: GlobalFoundries 12LP (14LP+).

Branding and Model		Cores (threads)	Clock rate (GHz)		L3 cache (total)	TDP	Chiplets	Core config (Note: Core Complexes (CCX) × cores per CCX)	Release date	Launch price (Note: Manufacturer suggested retail price at launch)
Branding and Model		Cores (threads)	Base	PB2	L3 cache (total)	TDP	Chiplets	Core config	Release date	Launch price
Ryzen Threadripper	2990WX	32 (64)	3.0	4.2	64 MB	250 W	4 × CCD	8 × 4	Aug 13, 2018	US $1799
Ryzen Threadripper	2970WX	24 (48)	3.0	4.2	64 MB	250 W	4 × CCD	8 × 3	Oct 2018	US $1299
Ryzen Threadripper	2950X	16 (32)	3.5	4.4	32 MB	180 W	2 × CCD	4 × 4	Aug 31, 2018	US $899
Ryzen Threadripper	2920X	12 (24)	3.5	4.3	32 MB	180 W	2 × CCD	4 × 3	Oct 2018	US $649

=== Desktop APUs ===
Common features of Zen+ based desktop APUs:

- Socket: AM4.
- All the CPUs support DDR4-2933 in dual-channel mode, while Athlon Pro 300GE and Athlon Silver Pro 3125GE support only DDR4-2666.
- L1 cache: 96 KB (32 KB data + 64 KB instruction) per core.
- L2 cache: 512 KB per core.
- All the CPUs support 16 PCIe 3.0 lanes.
- Includes integrated GCN 5th generation GPU.
- Fabrication process: GlobalFoundries 12LP.

Model	CPU				GPU				TDP	Release date	Release price
Model	Cores (threads)	Clock rate (GHz)		L3 cache (total)	Model (Note: Starting with 2020 releases, AMD stopped referring to integrated graphics as "Vega", therefore all Vega based iGPUs are branded as AMD Radeon Graphics (instead Radeon Vega 3 or Radeon Vega 10).)	Config (Note: Unified shaders : Texture mapping units : Render output units and Compute units (CU))	Clock (MHz)	Processing power (GFLOPS) (Note: Single-precision performance is calculated from the base (or boost) core clock speed based on a FMA operation.)	TDP	Release date	Release price
Model	Cores (threads)	Base	Boost	L3 cache (total)	Model	Config	Clock (MHz)	Processing power (GFLOPS)	TDP	Release date	Release price
Athlon Pro 300GE	2 (4)	3.4	—N/a	4 MB	Vega 3	192:12:4; 3 CU	1100	424.4	35 W	Sep 30, 2019	OEM
Athlon Silver Pro 3125GE	2 (4)	3.4	—N/a	4 MB	Radeon; Graphics	192:12:4; 3 CU	1100	424.4	35 W	Jul 21, 2020	OEM
Athlon Gold 3150GE	4 (4)	3.3	3.8	4 MB	Radeon; Graphics	192:12:4; 3 CU	1100	424.4	35 W	Jul 21, 2020	OEM
Athlon Gold Pro 3150GE	4 (4)	3.3	3.8	4 MB	Radeon; Graphics	192:12:4; 3 CU	1100	424.4	35 W	Jul 21, 2020	OEM
Athlon Gold 3150G	4 (4)	3.5	3.9	4 MB	Radeon; Graphics	192:12:4; 3 CU	1100	424.4	65 W	Jul 21, 2020	OEM
Athlon Gold Pro 3150G	4 (4)	3.5	3.9	4 MB	Radeon; Graphics	192:12:4; 3 CU	1100	424.4	65 W	Jul 21, 2020	OEM
Ryzen 3 3200GE	4 (4)	3.3	3.8	4 MB	Vega 8	512:32:16; 8 CU	1200	1228.8	35 W	Jul 7, 2019	OEM
Ryzen 3 Pro 3200GE	4 (4)	3.3	3.8	4 MB	Vega 8	512:32:16; 8 CU	1200	1228.8	35 W	Sep 30, 2019	OEM
Ryzen 3 3200G	4 (4)	3.6	4.0	4 MB	Vega 8	512:32:16; 8 CU	1250	1280	65 W	Jul 7, 2019	US $99
Ryzen 3 Pro 3200G	4 (4)	3.6	4.0	4 MB	Vega 8	512:32:16; 8 CU	1250	1280	65 W	Sep 30, 2019	OEM
Ryzen 5 Pro 3350GE	4 (4)	3.3	3.9	4 MB	Radeon; Graphics	640:40:16; 10 CU	1200	1536	35 W	Jul 21, 2020	OEM
Ryzen 5 Pro 3350G	4 (8)	3.6	4.0	4 MB	Radeon; Graphics	640:40:16; 10 CU	1300	1830.4	65 W	Jul 21, 2020	OEM
Ryzen 5 3400GE	4 (8)	3.3	4.0	4 MB	Vega 11	704:44:16; 11 CU	1300	1830.4	35 W	Jul 7, 2019	OEM
Ryzen 5 Pro 3400GE	4 (8)	3.3	4.0	4 MB	Vega 11	704:44:16; 11 CU	1300	1830.4	35 W	Sep 30, 2019	OEM
Ryzen 5 3400G	4 (8)	3.7	4.2	4 MB	RX Vega 11	704:44:16; 11 CU	1400	1971.2	65 W	Jul 7, 2019	US $149
Ryzen 5 Pro 3400G	4 (8)	3.7	4.2	4 MB	Vega 11	704:44:16; 11 CU	1400	1971.2	65 W	Sep 30, 2019	OEM

=== Mobile APUs ===
Common features of Ryzen 3000 notebook APUs:

- Socket: FP5.
- All the CPUs support DDR4-2400 in dual-channel mode.
- L1 cache: 96 KB (32 KB data + 64 KB instruction) per core.
- L2 cache: 512 KB per core.
- All the CPUs support 16 PCIe 3.0 lanes.
- Includes integrated GCN 5th generation GPU.
- Fabrication process: GlobalFoundries 12LP (14LP+).

Branding and Model		CPU					GPU				TDP	Release date
Branding and Model		Cores (threads)	Clock rate (GHz)		L3 cache (total)	Core config (Note: Core Complexes (CCX) × cores per CCX)	Model	Clock (GHz)	Config (Note: Unified Shaders : Texture Mapping Units : Render Output Units and Compute Units (CU))	Processing power (GFLOPS) (Note: Single precision performance is calculated from the base (or boost) core clock speed based on a FMA operation.)	TDP	Release date
Branding and Model		Cores (threads)	Base	Boost	L3 cache (total)	Core config	Model	Clock (GHz)	Config	Processing power (GFLOPS)	TDP	Release date
Ryzen 7	3780U	4 (8)	2.3	4.0	4 MB	1 × 4	RX Vega 11	1.4	704:44:16; 11 CU	1971.2	15 W	Oct 2019
Ryzen 7	3750H	4 (8)	2.3	4.0	4 MB	1 × 4	RX Vega 10	1.4	640:40:16; 10 CU	1792.0	35 W	Jan 6, 2019
Ryzen 7	3700C	4 (8)	2.3	4.0	4 MB	1 × 4	RX Vega 10	1.4	640:40:16; 10 CU	1792.0	15 W	Sep 22, 2020
Ryzen 7	3700U (Note: Model also available as PRO version, released April 8, 2019.)	4 (8)	2.3	4.0	4 MB	1 × 4	RX Vega 10	1.4	640:40:16; 10 CU	1792.0	15 W	Jan 6, 2019
Ryzen 5	3580U	4 (8)	2.1	3.7	4 MB	1 × 4	Vega 9	1.3	576:36:16; 9 CU	1497.6	15 W	Oct 2019
Ryzen 5	3550H	4 (8)	2.1	3.7	4 MB	1 × 4	Vega 8	1.2	512:32:8; 8 CU	1228.8	35 W	Jan 6, 2019
Ryzen 5	3500C	4 (8)	2.1	3.7	4 MB	1 × 4	Vega 8	1.2	512:32:8; 8 CU	1228.8	15 W	Sep 22, 2020
Ryzen 5	3500U	4 (8)	2.1	3.7	4 MB	1 × 4	Vega 8	1.2	512:32:8; 8 CU	1228.8	15 W	Jan 6, 2019
Ryzen 5	3450U	4 (8)	2.1	3.5	4 MB	1 × 4	Vega 8	1.2	512:32:8; 8 CU	1228.8	15 W	Jun 2020
Ryzen 3	3350U	4 (4)	2.1	3.5	4 MB	1 × 4	Vega 6	1.2	384:24:8; 6 CU	921.6	15 W	Jan 6, 2019
Ryzen 3	3300U	4 (4)	2.1	3.5	4 MB	1 × 4	Vega 6	1.2	384:24:8; 6 CU	921.6	15 W	Jan 6, 2019

=== Embedded APUs ===
In 2022, AMD announced the R2000 series of embedded APUs.

Model	Release date	Fab	CPU						GPU				Socket	PCIe support	Memory support	TDP
Model	Release date	Fab	Cores (threads)	Clock rate (GHz)		Cache			Archi- tecture	Config (Note: Unified Shaders : Texture Mapping Units : Render Output Units and Compute Units (CU))	Clock (GHz)	Processing power (Note: Single-precision performance is calculated from the base (or boost) core clock speed based on a FMA operation.) (GFLOPS)	Socket	PCIe support	Memory support	TDP
Model	Release date	Fab	Cores (threads)	Base	Boost	L1	L2	L3	Archi- tecture	Config	Clock (GHz)	Processing power (GFLOPS)	Socket	PCIe support	Memory support	TDP
R2312	June 7, 2022	GloFo; 12LP	2 (4)	2.7	3.5	64 KB inst. 32 KB data per core	512 KB per core	4 MB	GCN 5	192:12:4; 3 CU	1.2	460.8	FP5	8 lanes Gen 3	DDR4-2400 dual-channel ECC	10–25 W
R2314	June 7, 2022	GloFo; 12LP	4 (4)	2.1	3.5	64 KB inst. 32 KB data per core	512 KB per core	4 MB	GCN 5	384:24:8; 6 CU	1.2	921.6	FP5	16 lanes Gen 3	DDR4-2666 dual-channel ECC	10–35 W

== See also ==
- AMD K9
- AMD K10
- Jim Keller (engineer)
- Ryzen
- Steamroller (microarchitecture)
- Zen (microarchitecture)
- Zen 2

Turion / ULV		Node range label	x86			
Microarchi.	Step	Node range label	Microarchi.	Step		
		180 nm	K7	Athlon Classic		
		180 nm	K7	Thunderbird		
		180 nm	K7	Palomino		
		130 nm	K7	Thoroughbred		
		130 nm	K7	Barton/Thorton		
		130 nm	K8	ClawHammer		
		130 nm	K8	Newcastle		
		130 nm	K8	SledgeHammer		
K8L	Lancaster	90 nm	K8	Winchester	K8(×2)	K9
K8L	Richmond	90 nm	K8	San Diego	Toledo	~~Greyhound~~
K8L	Taylor / Trinidad	90 nm	K8	San Diego	Windsor	
K8L	Tyler	65 nm	K8	Orleans	Brisbane	
K8L	Lion	65 nm	K10	Phenom	4 cores on mainstream desktop, DDR3 introduced	
K8L	Caspian	45 nm	K10	Phenom II / Athlon II	6 cores on mainstream desktop	
14h	Bobcat	40 nm				
		32 nm	K10	Lynx		
		32 nm	K10	Llano	APU introduced; CPU and GPU on single die	
		32 nm	Bulldozer 15h	Bulldozer	8 cores on mainstream desktop	
		32 nm	Bulldozer 15h	Piledriver		
16h	Jaguar	28 nm	Bulldozer 15h	Steamroller	APU/mobile-only	
16h	Puma	28 nm	Bulldozer 15h	Excavator	APU/mobile-only, DDR4 introduced	
K12	~~K12 (ARM64)~~	14 nm	Zen	Zen	SMT introduced	
		12 nm	Zen	Zen+		
		7 nm	Zen	Zen 2	12 and 16 cores on mainstream desktop, chiplet design	
		7 nm	Zen	Zen 3	3D V-Cache variants introduced	
		6 nm	Zen	Zen 3+	Mobile-only, DDR5 introduced	
		5 nm / 4 nm	Zen	Zen 4	High core density "Cloud" (Zen xc) variants introduced	
		4 nm / 3 nm	Zen	Zen 5	Ryzen AI NPU cores introduced	
		3 nm / 2 nm	Zen	Zen 6		
		2 nm	Zen	Zen 7		
