= AMD Wraith =

Family of computer coolers

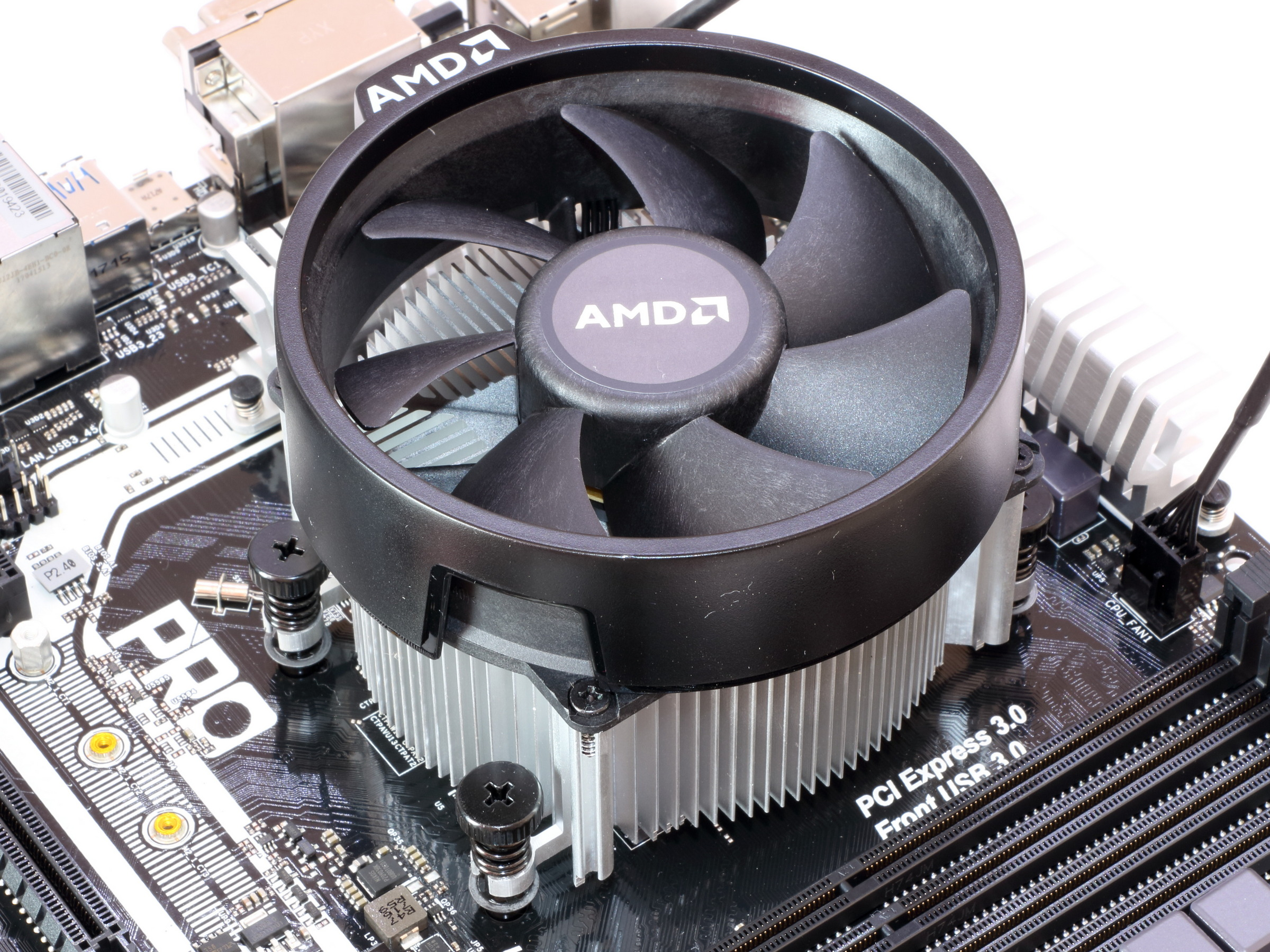
The Wraith Spire

AMD Wraith is a family of downdraft type CPU coolers designed by AMD. The Wraith was introduced as a heatpipe-equipped stock cooler for certain AMD FX CPUs and AMD A-series APUs. With the launch of AMD Ryzen, the Wraith lineup has been updated to four new variants, varying in design, cooling capabilities, and lighting features. They are bundled in many of AMD's Socket AM4 & Socket AM5-based products except their high-end and high-powered Ryzen CPU line-up. The coolers were supplied by several manufacturers such as Cooler Master, Foxconn, and Delta Electronics.

== Models ==
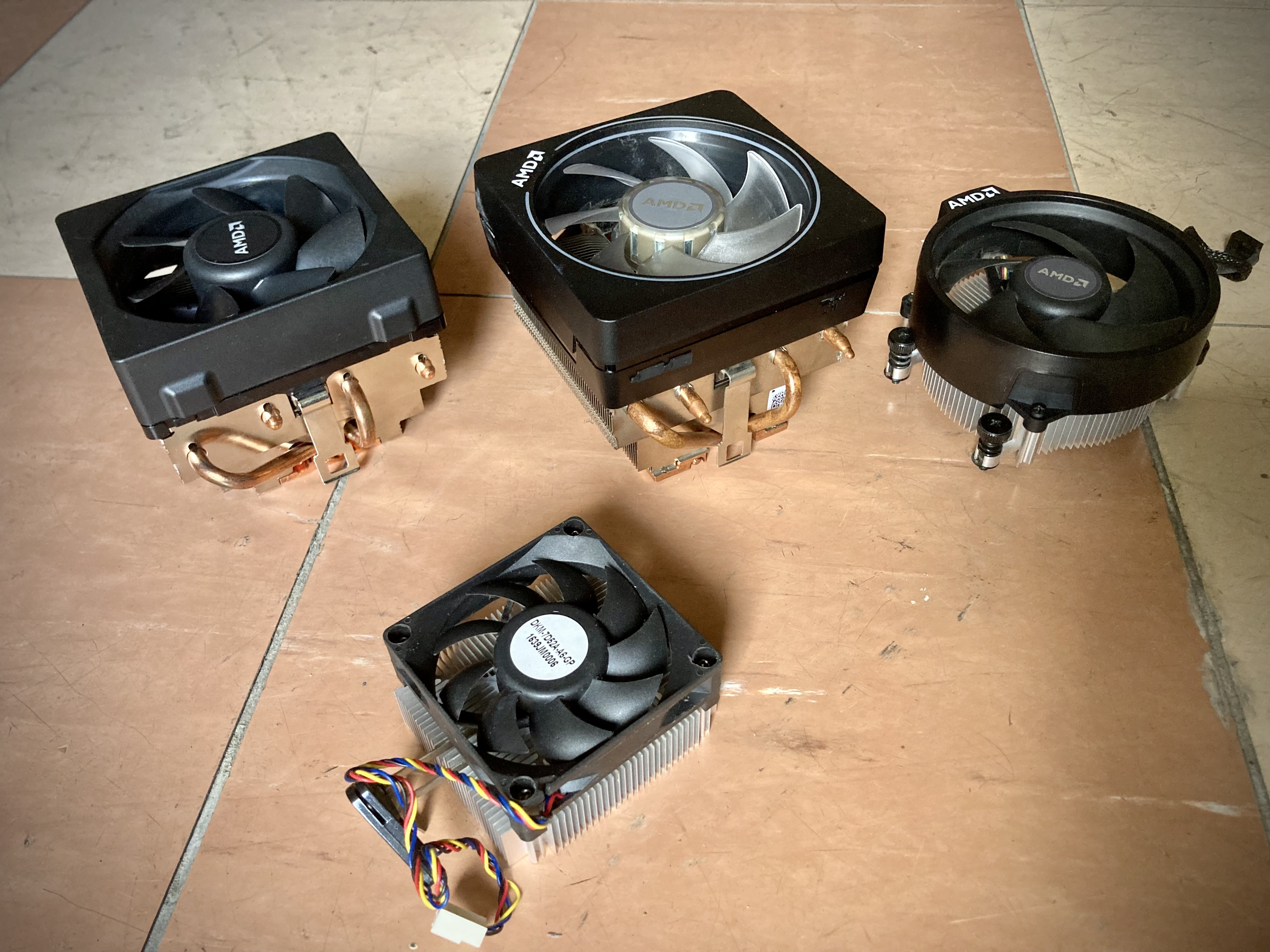
From left to right: Original AMD Wraith, Wraith Prism and Wraith Stealth. On the foreground is AMD's generic cooler for comparison. Notice the different mounting mechanism of Wraith Stealth which uses screw instead of bracket.

=== Wraith (Original) ===
The original model of Wraith features a square body with copper fins and a white-illuminated AMD logo on the side. It is bundled with the socket AM3+ AMD FX 6350 and 8350 CPUs, as well as the socket FM2+ A10-7890K APU, and is rated for a 125W TDP. The cooler however is forwards-compatible and can be used with the newer Socket AM4/AM5 based motherboards due to its two-pronged clamp mounting mechanism.

=== Wraith Stealth ===
The Wraith Stealth (product code: SR1) is the most basic cooling solution, sporting a circular body with extruded aluminum fins. It is bundled with Ryzen 3, Ryzen 5, and certain Ryzen 7 (5700G) CPUs and has a rating of 65W TDP. Like the Spire, the Stealth uses mounting screws (as opposed to a mounting bracket) and thus the cooler is only compatible with Socket AM4 or AM5 motherboards.

=== Wraith Spire ===
The Wraith Spire (product code: SR2a) shares a similar design with Wraith Stealth, sporting a circular body but with taller extruded aluminum fins. A cylindrical vapor chamber passes through the center of the cooler, protruding at the bottom to contact the CPU. The vapor chamber was removed on all Spire coolers bundled with Ryzen 3000 CPUs. Wraith Spires were offered in two variants, one with and one without a programmable RGB LED ring. It was usually bundled with Ryzen 5 and Ryzen 7 CPUs and had a rating of 95W TDP. The LED ring variant was discontinued with the Ryzen 3000 launch. Starting 1 August 2025, the Wraith Spire was declared end-of-life and would no longer be included in new shipments of boxed CPUs. Going forward, the affected boxed units would include a Wraith Stealth instead.

=== Wraith Max ===
The Wraith Max was the most capable cooler AMD offered for Ryzen CPUs. It is an enlarged version of the original Wraith which sports a square body, a copper base, four heat pipes that make direct contact with the CPU, and a programmable RGB LED ring. The mounting mechanism is different from the Wraith Stealth and Spire. Due to the use of a two-pronged clamp, the Wraith Max is backwards compatible on previous generation AMD CPUs dating back to Socket 754/Socket 939. It has a rating of 140W TDP. It can only be obtained as an aftermarket upgrade or bundled by OEM system integrators as part of pre-built PCs. The Wraith Max was discontinued with the release of its successor, the Wraith Prism. The fan's case has two cable connectors (one that connects to an RGB header, and another one for a USB header) and a switch to select between silent and normal operation modes.

=== Wraith Prism ===
The Wraith Prism (product code: SR4) debuted with the launch of 2nd-generation AMD Ryzen (Zen+) CPUs. The cooler is basically an updated Wraith Max and looks very similar, featuring the same copper base, four heat pipes (albeit not making direct contact with the CPU), and a programmable RGB LED ring. In addition, the fan is transparent and is also lit via RGB LEDs. It could be either obtained as an aftermarket upgrade or bundled with some Ryzen 7 and Ryzen 9 CPUs and has a rating of 140W TDP. Starting 1 August 2025, the Wraith Prism was declared end-of-life and would no longer be included in new shipments of boxed CPUs. Going forward, the affected boxed units would no longer include any cooler.

== See also ==
- Ryzen
- Threadripper
- Epyc
- AMD FX
- AMD APU
