= AMD APU =

Series of microprocessors by AMD

- A-series APU
- Release date: 2011 (original); 2017 (Zen-based)
- Codename: Fusion; Desna; Ontario; Zacate; Llano; Hondo; Trinity; Weatherford; Richland; Kaveri; Godavari; Kabini; Temash; Carrizo; Bristol Ridge; Raven Ridge; Picasso; Renoir; Cezanne; Phoenix; IGP; Wrestler; WinterPark; BeaverCreek
- Architecture: AMD64
- Models: Desktop E-Series; Desktop A-Series; Notebook A, E, C and FX Series; AMD Athlon with Radeon Graphics; AMD Ryzen with Radeon Graphics
- Cores: 1 to 8
- Transistors: 32 nm 1.178B (Llano); 32 nm 1.303B (Trinity); 32 nm 1.3B (Richland); 28 nm 2.41B (Kaveri); 14 nm 4.95B (Raven Ridge); 12 nm (Picasso); 7 nm (Renoir & Cezanne); 6 nm (Rembrandt); 4 nm (Phoenix)

API support
- OpenCL: 1.2
- OpenGL: 4.1+
- DirectX: Direct3D 11; Direct3D 12

History
- Predecessor: Athlon II; Sempron

AMD Accelerated Processing Unit (APU), formerly known as Fusion, is a series of 64-bit microprocessors from Advanced Micro Devices (AMD), combining a general-purpose AMD64 central processing unit (CPU) and 3D integrated graphics processing unit (IGPU) on a single die.

AMD announced the first generation APUs, Llano for high-performance and Brazos for low-power devices, in January 2011 and launched the first units on June 14. The second generation Trinity for high-performance and Brazos-2 for low-power devices were announced in June 2012. The third generation Kaveri for high performance devices were launched in January 2014, while Kabini and Temash for low-power devices were announced in the summer of 2013. Since the launch of the Zen microarchitecture, Ryzen and Athlon APUs have released to the global market as Raven Ridge on the DDR4 platform, after Bristol Ridge a year prior.

AMD has also supplied semi-custom APUs for consoles starting with the release of Sony PlayStation 4 and Microsoft Xbox One eighth generation video game consoles.

== History ==
The AMD Fusion project started in 2006 with the aim of developing a system on a chip that combined a CPU with a GPU on a single die. This effort was moved forward by AMD's acquisition of graphics chipset manufacturer ATI in 2006. The project reportedly required three internal iterations of the Fusion concept to create a product deemed worthy of release. Reasons contributing to the delay of the project include the technical difficulties of combining a CPU and GPU on the same die at a 45 nm process, and conflicting views on what the role of the CPU and GPU should be within the project.

The first generation desktop and laptop APU, codenamed Llano, was announced on 4 January 2011 at the 2011 Consumer Electronics Show in Las Vegas and released shortly thereafter. It featured K10 CPU cores and a Radeon HD 6000 series GPU on the same die on the FM1 socket. An APU for low-power devices was announced as the Brazos platform, based on the Bobcat microarchitecture and a Radeon HD 6000 series GPU on the same die.

At a conference in January 2012, corporate fellow Phil Rogers announced that AMD would re-brand the Fusion platform as the Heterogeneous System Architecture (HSA), stating that "it's only fitting that the name of this evolving architecture and platform be representative of the entire, technical community that is leading the way in this very important area of technology and programming development." However, it was later revealed that AMD had been the subject of a trademark infringement lawsuit by the Swiss company Arctic, who used the name "Fusion" for a line of power supply products.

The second generation desktop and laptop APU, codenamed Trinity, was announced at AMD's 2010 Financial Analyst Day and released in October 2012. It featured Piledriver CPU cores and Radeon HD 7000 series GPU cores on the FM2 socket. AMD released a new APU based on the Piledriver microarchitecture on 12 March 2013 for Laptops/Mobile and on 4 June 2013 for desktops under the codename Richland. The second generation APU for low-power devices, Brazos 2.0, used exactly the same APU chip, but ran at higher clock speed and rebranded the GPU as Radeon HD 7000 series and used a new I/O controller chip.

Semi-custom chips were introduced in the Microsoft Xbox One and Sony PlayStation 4 video game consoles, and subsequently in the Microsoft Xbox Series X|S and Sony PlayStation 5 consoles.

A third generation of the technology was released on 14 January 2014, featuring greater integration between CPU and GPU. The desktop and laptop variant is codenamed Kaveri, based on the Steamroller architecture, while the low-power variants, codenamed Kabini and Temash, are based on the Jaguar architecture.

Since the introduction of Zen-based processors, AMD renamed their APUs as the Ryzen with Radeon Graphics and Athlon with Radeon Graphics, with desktop units assigned with G suffix on their model numbers (e.g. Ryzen 5 3400G & Athlon 3000G) to distinguish them from regular processors or with basic graphics and also to differentiate away from their former Bulldozer era A-series APUs. The mobile counterparts were always paired with Radeon Graphics regardless of suffixes.

== Features ==
=== Heterogeneous System Architecture ===
AMD is a founding member of the Heterogeneous System Architecture (HSA) Foundation and is consequently actively working on developing HSA in cooperation with other members. The following hardware and software implementations are available in AMD's APU-branded products:

Type	HSA feature	First implemented	Notes
Optimized Platform	GPU Compute C++ Support	2012; Trinity APUs	Support OpenCL C++ directions and Microsoft's C++ AMP language extension. This eases programming of both CPU and GPU working together to process support parallel workloads.
Optimized Platform	HSA-aware MMU	2012; Trinity APUs	GPU can access the entire system memory through the translation services and page fault management of the HSA MMU.
Optimized Platform	Shared Power Management	2012; Trinity APUs	CPU and GPU now share the power budget. Priority goes to the processor most suited to the current tasks.
Architectural Integration	Heterogeneous Memory Management: the CPU's MMU and the GPU's IOMMU share the same address space.	2014; PlayStation 4, Kaveri APUs	CPU and GPU now access the memory with the same address space. Pointers can now be freely passed between CPU and GPU, hence enabling zero-copy.
Architectural Integration	Fully coherent memory between CPU and GPU	2014; PlayStation 4, Kaveri APUs	GPU can now access and cache data from coherent memory regions in the system memory, and also reference the data from CPU's cache. Cache coherency is maintained.
Architectural Integration	GPU uses pageable system memory via CPU pointers	2014; PlayStation 4, Kaveri APUs	GPU can take advantage of the shared virtual memory between CPU and GPU, and pageable system memory can now be referenced directly by the GPU, instead of being copied or pinned before accessing.
System Integration	GPU compute context switch	2015; Carrizo APU	Compute tasks on GPU can be context switched, allowing a multi-tasking environment and also faster interpretation between applications, compute and graphics.
System Integration	GPU graphics pre-emption	2015; Carrizo APU	Long-running graphics tasks can be pre-empted so processes have low latency access to the GPU.
System Integration	Quality of service	2015; Carrizo APU	In addition to context switch and pre-emption, hardware resources can be either equalized or prioritized among multiple users and applications.

=== Feature overview ===
The following table shows features of AMD's processors with 3D graphics, including APUs (see also: List of AMD processors with 3D graphics).

Platform			High, standard and low power														Low and ultra-low power								
Codename	Server	Basic						Toronto																	
Codename	Server	Micro																Kyoto							
Codename	Desktop	Performance													Raphael	Phoenix									
Codename	Desktop	Mainstream	Llano	Trinity	Richland	Kaveri	Kaveri Refresh (Godavari)	Carrizo	Bristol Ridge	Raven Ridge	Picasso	Renoir	Cezanne		Raphael	Phoenix									
Codename	Desktop	Entry	Llano	Trinity	Richland	Kaveri	Kaveri Refresh (Godavari)	Carrizo	Bristol Ridge	Raven Ridge	Picasso	Renoir	Cezanne			Phoenix									
Codename	Desktop	Basic																Kabini				Dalí			
Codename	Mobile	Performance										Renoir	Cezanne	Rembrandt	Dragon Range										
Codename	Mobile	Mainstream	Llano	Trinity	Richland	Kaveri		Carrizo	Bristol Ridge	Raven Ridge	Picasso	Renoir Lucienne	Cezanne Barceló	Rembrandt	Dragon Range	Phoenix									
Codename	Mobile	Entry	Llano	Trinity	Richland	Kaveri		Carrizo	Bristol Ridge	Raven Ridge												Dalí			Mendocino
Codename	Mobile	Basic															Desna, Ontario, Zacate	Kabini, Temash	Beema, Mullins	Carrizo-L	Stoney Ridge	Dalí	Pollock		Mendocino
Codename	Embedded			Trinity		Bald Eagle		Merlin Falcon, Brown Falcon		Great Horned Owl		Grey Hawk					Ontario, Zacate	Kabini	Steppe Eagle, Crowned Eagle, LX-Family		Prairie Falcon	Banded Kestrel		River Hawk	
Released			Aug 2011	Oct 2012	Jun 2013	Jan 2014	2015	Jun 2015	Jun 2016	Oct 2017	Jan 2019	Mar 2020	Jan 2021	Jan 2022	Sep 2022	Jan 2023	Jan 2011	May 2013	Apr 2014	May 2015	Feb 2016	Apr 2019	Jul 2020	Jun 2022	Nov 2022
CPU microarchitecture			K10	Piledriver		Steamroller		Excavator	"Excavator+"	Zen	Zen+	Zen 2	Zen 3	Zen 3+	Zen 4		Bobcat	Jaguar	Puma	Puma+	"Excavator+"	Zen		Zen+	"Zen 2+"
ISA			x86-64 v1	x86-64 v2				x86-64 v3							x86-64 v4		x86-64 v1	x86-64 v2			x86-64 v3				
Socket	Desktop	Performance	—N/a												AM5	—N/a	—N/a								
Socket	Desktop	Mainstream	—N/a					AM4						—N/a	AM5	—N/a	—N/a								
Socket	Desktop	Entry	FM1	FM2		FM2+		FM2+ (Note: For FM2+ Excavator models: A8-7680, A6-7480 & Athlon X4 845.), AM4	AM4					—N/a			—N/a								
Socket	Desktop	Basic	—N/a														—N/a	AM1	—N/a			FP5	—N/a		
Socket	Other		FS1	FS1+, FP2		FP3		FP4		FP5		FP6		FP7	FL1	FP7; FP7r2; FP8	FT1	FT3	FT3b		FP4	FP5	FT5	FP5	FT6
PCI Express version			2.0			3.0								4.0	5.0	4.0	2.0				3.0				
CXL			—N/a														—N/a								
Fab. (nm)			GF 32SHP (HKMG SOI)			GF 28SHP (HKMG bulk)				GF 14LPP (FinFET bulk)	GF 12LP (FinFET bulk)	TSMC N7 (FinFET bulk)		TSMC N6 (FinFET bulk)	CCD: TSMC N5 (FinFET bulk) cIOD: TSMC N6 (FinFET bulk)	TSMC 4nm (FinFET bulk)	TSMC N40 (bulk)	TSMC N28 (HKMG bulk)	GF 28SHP (HKMG bulk)			GF 14LPP (FinFET bulk)		GF 12LP (FinFET bulk)	TSMC N6 (FinFET bulk)
Die area (mm^{2})			228	246		245		245	250	210		156	180	210	CCD: (2x) 70 cIOD: 122	178	75 (+ 28 FCH)	107		?	125	149			~100
Min TDP (W)			35	17				12				10		15	65	35	4.5	4	3.95	10	6			12	8
Max APU TDP (W)			100			95		65						45	170	54	18	25					6	54	15
Max stock APU base clock (GHz)			3	3.8	4.1	4.1		3.7	3.8	3.6	3.7	3.8	4.0	3.3	4.7	4.3	1.75	2.2	2	2.2	3.2	2.6	1.2	3.35	2.8
Max APUs per node (Note: A PC would be one node.)			1														1								
Max core dies per CPU			1												2	1	1								
Max CCX per core die			1									2	1				1								
Max cores per CCX			4										8				2	4			2			4	
Max CPU (Note: An APU combines a CPU and a GPU. Both have cores.) cores per APU			4									8			16	8	2	4			2			4	
Max threads per CPU core			1							2							1					2			
Integer pipeline structure			3+3	2+2						4+2		4+2+1	1+3+3+1+2				1+1+1+1				2+2	4+2			4+2+1
i386, i486, i586, CMOV, NOPL, i686, PAE, NX bit, CMPXCHG16B, AMD-V, RVI, ABM, and 64-bit LAHF/SAHF			Yes														Yes								
IOMMU (Note: Requires firmware support.)			—N/a	v2													v1		v2						
BMI1, AES-NI, CLMUL, and F16C			—N/a	Yes													—N/a	Yes							
MOVBE			—N/a					Yes									—N/a	Yes							
AVIC, BMI2, RDRAND, and MWAITX/MONITORX			—N/a					Yes									—N/a				Yes				
SME (Note: Requires firmware support.), TSME, ADX, SHA, RDSEED, SMAP, SMEP, XSAVEC, XSAVES, XRSTORS, CLFLUSHOPT, CLZERO, and PTE Coalescing			—N/a							Yes							—N/a					Yes			
GMET, WBNOINVD, CLWB, QOS, PQE-BW, RDPID, RDPRU, and MCOMMIT			—N/a									Yes					—N/a								Yes
MPK, VAES			—N/a										Yes				—N/a								
SGX			—N/a														—N/a								
FPUs per core			1	0.5						1							1				0.5	1			
Pipes per FPU			2														2								
FPU pipe width			128-bit									256-bit					80-bit	128-bit							256-bit
CPU instruction set SIMD level			SSE4a (Note: No SSE4. No SSSE3.)	AVX				AVX2							AVX-512		SSSE3	AVX			AVX2				
3DNow!			3DNow!+	—N/a													—N/a								
PREFETCH/PREFETCHW			Yes														Yes								
GFNI			—N/a												Yes		—N/a								
AMX			—N/a														—N/a								
FMA4, LWP, TBM, and XOP			—N/a	Yes						—N/a							—N/a				Yes	—N/a			
FMA3			—N/a	Yes													—N/a				Yes				
AMD XDNA			—N/a													Yes	—N/a								
L1 data cache per core (KiB)			64	16				32									32								
L1 data cache associativity (ways)			2	4				8									8								
L1 instruction caches per core			1	0.5						1							1				0.5	1			
Max APU total L1 instruction cache (KiB)			256	128		192				256					512	256	64		128		96	128			
L1 instruction cache associativity (ways)			2			3				4		8					2				3	4			8
L2 caches per core			1	0.5						1							1				0.5	1			
Max APU total L2 cache (MiB)			4					2				4			16		1	2			1			2	
L2 cache associativity (ways)			16							8							16					8			
Max on-die L3 cache per CCX (MiB)			—N/a							4			16		32		—N/a						4		
Max 3D V-Cache per CCD (MiB)			—N/a							—N/a					64	—N/a	—N/a						—N/a		
Max total in-CCD L3 cache per APU (MiB)			—N/a							4		8	16		64		—N/a						4		
Max. total 3D V-Cache per APU (MiB)			—N/a							—N/a					64	—N/a	—N/a						—N/a		
Max. board L3 cache per APU (MiB)			—N/a							—N/a							—N/a						—N/a		
Max total L3 cache per APU (MiB)			—N/a							4		8	16		128		—N/a						4		
APU L3 cache associativity (ways)			—N/a							16							—N/a						16		
L3 cache scheme			—N/a							Victim							—N/a						Victim		
Max. L4 cache			—N/a														—N/a								
Max stock DRAM support			DDR3-1866		DDR3-2133			DDR3-2133, DDR4-2400	DDR4-2400	DDR4-2933		DDR4-3200, LPDDR4-4266		DDR5-4800, LPDDR5-6400	DDR5-5200	DDR5-5600, LPDDR5x-7500	DDR3L-1333	DDR3L-1600	DDR3L-1866		DDR3-1866, DDR4-2400	DDR4-2400	DDR4-1600	DDR4-3200	LPDDR5-5500
Max DRAM channels per APU			2														1					2	1	2	
Max stock DRAM bandwidth (GB/s) per APU			29.866		34.132			38.400		46.932		68.256		102.400	83.200	120.000	10.666	12.800	14.933		19.200	38.400	12.800	51.200	88.000
GPU microarchitecture			TeraScale 2 (VLIW5)	TeraScale 3 (VLIW4)		GCN 2nd gen		GCN 3rd gen		GCN 5th gen				RDNA 2		RDNA 3	TeraScale 2 (VLIW5)	GCN 2nd gen			GCN 3rd gen	GCN 5th gen			RDNA 2
GPU instruction set			TeraScale instruction set			GCN instruction set								RDNA instruction set			TeraScale instruction set	GCN instruction set							RDNA instruction set
Max stock GPU base clock (MHz)			600	800	844	866		1108		1250	1400	2100		2400	400		538	600	?	847	900	1200	600	1300	1900
Max stock GPU base GFLOPS (Note: Single-precision performance is calculated from the base (or boost) core clock speed based on a FMA operation.)			480	614.4	648.1	886.7		1134.5		1760	1971.2	2150.4		3686.4	102.4		86	?	?	?	345.6	460.8	230.4	1331.2	486.4
3D engine (Note: Unified shaders : texture mapping units : render output units)			Up to 400:20:8	Up to 384:24:6		Up to 512:32:8				Up to 704:44:16		Up to 512:32:8		768:48:8	128:8:4		80:8:4	128:8:4			Up to 192:12:8	Up to 192:12:4	192:12:4	Up to 512:?:?	128:?:?
3D engine			IOMMUv1			IOMMUv2											IOMMUv1		?		IOMMUv2				
Video decoder			UVD 3.0			UVD 4.2		UVD 6.0		VCN 1.0		VCN 2.1	VCN 2.2	VCN 3.1		?	UVD 3.0	UVD 4.0	UVD 4.2		UVD 6.2	VCN 1.0			VCN 3.1
Video encoder			—N/a	VCE 1.0		VCE 2.0		VCE 3.1		VCN 1.0		VCN 2.1	VCN 2.2	VCN 3.1		?	—N/a	VCE 2.0			VCE 3.4	VCN 1.0			VCN 3.1
AMD Fluid Motion			No			Yes				No							No		Yes			No			
GPU power saving			PowerPlay	PowerTune													PowerPlay	PowerTune							
TrueAudio			—N/a			Yes							?				—N/a	Yes							
FreeSync			—N/a			1; 2											—N/a	1; 2							
HDCP (Note: To play protected video content, it also requires card, operating system, driver, and application support. A compatible HDCP display is also needed for this. HDCP is mandatory for the output of certain audio formats, placing additional constraints on the multimedia setup.)			?			1.4				2.2				2.3			?	1.4				2.2			2.3
PlayReady			—N/a							3.0 not yet							—N/a					3.0 not yet			
Supported displays (Note: To feed more than two displays, the additional panels must have native DisplayPort support. Alternatively active DisplayPort-to-DVI/HDMI/VGA adapters can be employed.)			2–3	2–4				3		3 (desktop); 4 (mobile, embedded)		4					2				3	4		4	
/drm/radeon (Note: DRM (Direct Rendering Manager) is a component of the Linux kernel. Support in this table refers to the most current version.)			Yes						—N/a								Yes				—N/a				
/drm/amdgpu			—N/a			Yes											—N/a	Yes							

== APU or Radeon Graphics branded platforms ==
AMD APUs have CPU modules, cache, and a discrete-class graphics processor, all on the same die using the same bus. This architecture allows for the use of graphics accelerators, such as OpenCL, with the integrated graphics processor. The goal is to create a "fully integrated" APU, which, according to AMD, will eventually feature 'heterogeneous cores' capable of processing both CPU and GPU work automatically, depending on the workload requirement.

=== TeraScale-based GPU ===
==== K10 architecture (2011): Llano ====
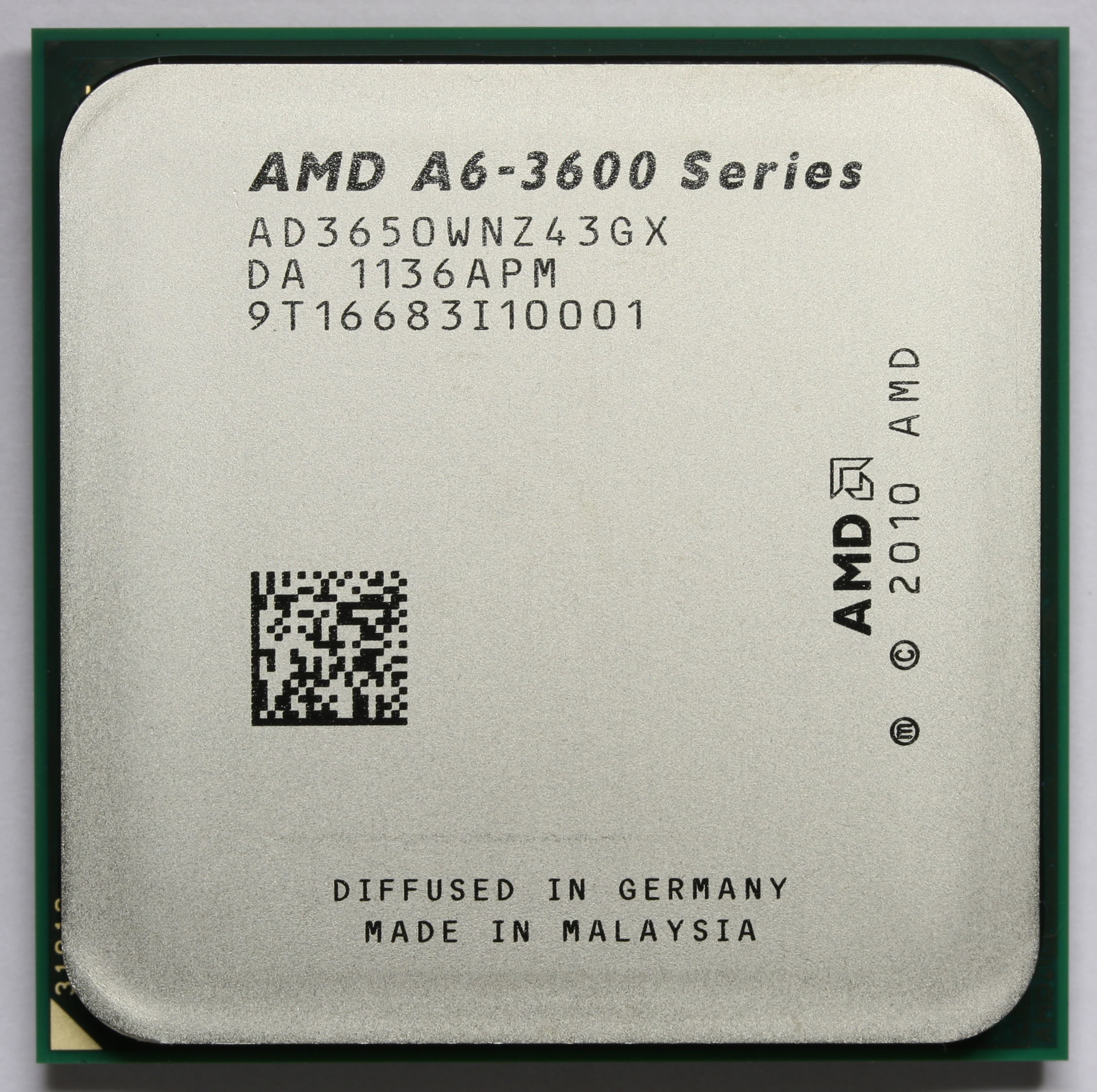
AMD A6-3650 (Llano)

- "Stars" AMD K10-cores
- Integrated Evergreen/VLIW5-based GPU (branded Radeon HD 6000 series)
- Northbridge
- PCIe
- DDR3 memory controller to arbitrate between coherent and non-coherent memory requests. The physical memory is partitioned between the GPU (up to 512 MB) and the CPU (the remainder).
- Unified Video Decoder
- AMD Eyefinity multi-monitor-support

The first generation APU, released in June 2011, was used in both desktops and laptops. It was based on the K10 architecture and built on a 32 nm process featuring two to four CPU cores on a thermal design power (TDP) of 65-100 W, and integrated graphics based on the Radeon HD 6000 series with support for DirectX 11, OpenGL 4.2 and OpenCL 1.2. In performance comparisons against the similarly priced Intel Core i3-2105, the Llano APU was criticised for its poor CPU performance and praised for its better GPU performance. AMD was later criticised for abandoning Socket FM1 after one generation.

==== Bobcat architecture (2011): Ontario, Zacate, Desna, Hondo ====
- Bobcat-based CPU
- Evergreen/VLIW5-based GPU (branded Radeon HD 6000 series and Radeon HD 7000 series)
- Northbridge
- PCIe support.
- DDR3 SDRAM memory controller to arbitrate between coherent and non-coherent memory requests. The physical memory is partitioned between the GPU (up to 512 MB) and the CPU (the remainder).
- Unified Video Decoder (UVD)

The AMD Brazos platform was introduced on 4 January 2011, targeting the subnotebook, netbook and low power small form factor markets. It features the 9-watt AMD C-Series APU (codename: Ontario) for netbooks and low power devices as well as the 18-watt AMD E-Series APU (codename: Zacate) for mainstream and value notebooks, all-in-ones and small form factor desktops. Both APUs feature one or two Bobcat x86 cores and a Radeon Evergreen Series GPU with full DirectX11, DirectCompute and OpenCL support including UVD3 video acceleration for HD video including 1080p.

AMD expanded the Brazos platform on 5 June 2011 with the announcement of the 5.9-watt AMD Z-Series APU (codename: Desna) designed for the Tablet market. The Desna APU is based on the 9-watt Ontario APU. Energy savings were achieved by lowering the CPU, GPU and northbridge voltages, reducing the idle clocks of the CPU and GPU as well as introducing a hardware thermal control mode. A bidirectional turbo core mode was also introduced.

AMD announced the Brazos-T platform on 9 October 2012. It comprised the 4.5-watt AMD Z-Series APU (codenamed Hondo) and the A55T Fusion Controller Hub (FCH), designed for the tablet computer market. The Hondo APU is a redesign of the Desna APU. AMD lowered energy use by optimizing the APU and FCH for tablet computers.

The Deccan platform including Krishna and Wichita APUs were cancelled in 2011. AMD had originally planned to release them in the second half 2012.

==== Piledriver architecture (2012): Trinity and Richland ====
Piledriver-based AMD APUs

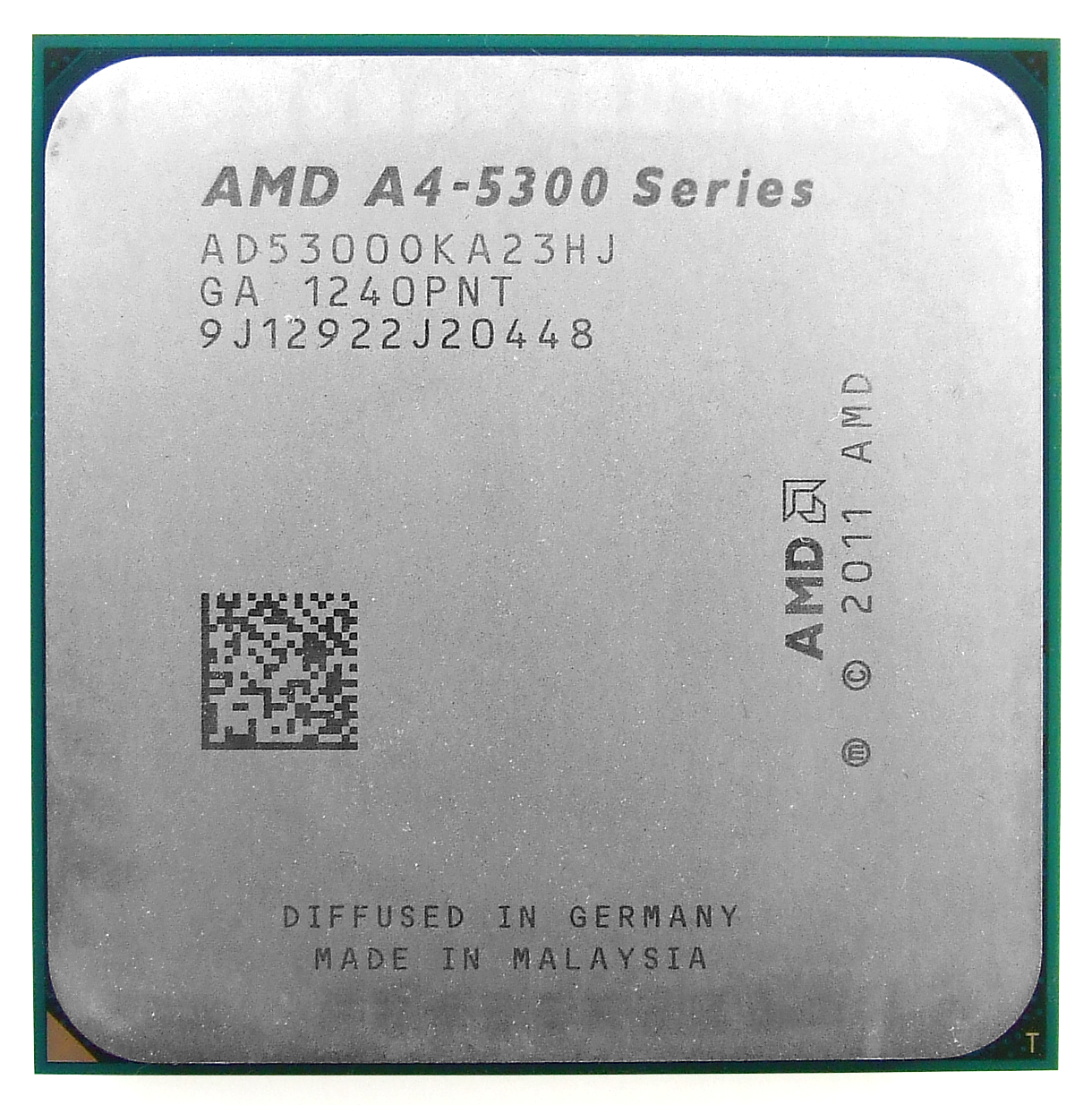
An AMD A4-5300 for desktop systems

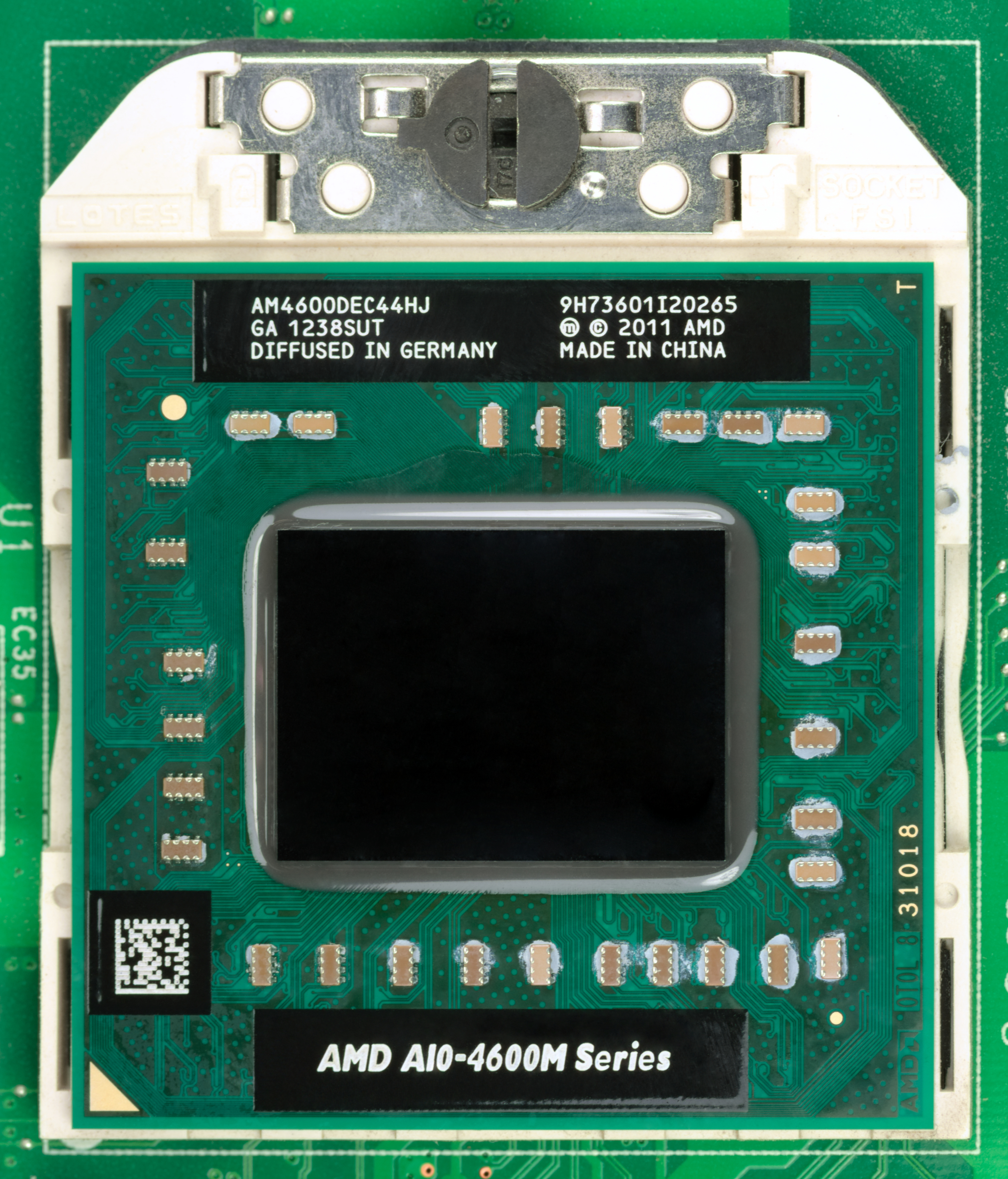
An AMD A10-4600M for mobile systems

- Piledriver-based CPU
- Northern Islands/VLIW4-based GPU (branded Radeon HD 7000 and 8000 series)
- Unified Northbridge – includes AMD Turbo Core 3.0, which enables automatic bidirectional power management between CPU modules and GPU. Power to the CPU and GPU is controlled automatically by changing the clock rate depending on the load. For example, for a non-overclocked A10-5800K APU the CPU frequency can change from 1.4 GHz to 4.2 GHz, and the GPU frequency can change from 304 MHz to 800 MHz. In addition, CC6 mode is capable of powering down individual CPU cores, while PC6 mode is able to lower the power on the entire rail.
- AMD HD Media Accelerator – includes AMD Perfect Picture HD, AMD Quick Stream technology, and AMD Steady Video technology.
- Display controllers: AMD Eyefinity-support for multi-monitor set-ups, HDMI, DisplayPort 1.2, DVI

Trinity

The first iteration of the second generation platform, released in October 2012, brought improvements to CPU and GPU performance to both desktops and laptops. The platform features 2 to 4 Piledriver CPU cores built on a 32 nm process with a TDP between 65 W and 100 W, and a GPU based on the Radeon HD7000 series with support for DirectX 11, OpenGL 4.2, and OpenCL 1.2. The Trinity APU was praised for the improvements to CPU performance compared to the Llano APU.

Richland

- "Enhanced Piledriver" CPU cores
- Temperature Smart Turbo Core technology. An advancement of the existing Turbo Core technology, which allows internal software to adjust the CPU and GPU clock speed to maximise performance within the constraints of the Thermal design power of the APU.
- New low-power consumption CPUs with only 45 W TDP

The release of this second iteration of this generation was 12 March 2013 for mobile parts and 5 June 2013 for desktop parts.

=== Graphics Core Next-based GPU ===
==== Jaguar architecture (2013): Kabini and Temash ====
- Jaguar-based CPU
- Graphics Core Next 2nd Gen-based GPU
- Socket AM1 and Socket FT3 support
- Target segment desktop and mobile

In January 2013 the Jaguar-based Kabini and Temash APUs were unveiled as the successors of the Bobcat-based Ontario, Zacate and Hondo APUs. The Kabini APU is aimed at the low-power, subnotebook, netbook, ultra-thin and small form factor markets, while the Temash APU is aimed at the tablet, ultra-low power and small form factor markets. The two to four Jaguar cores of the Kabini and Temash APUs feature numerous architectural improvements regarding power requirement and performance, such as support for newer x86-instructions, a higher IPC count, a CC6 power state mode and clock gating. Kabini and Temash are AMD's first, and also the first ever quad-core x86 based SoCs. The integrated Fusion Controller Hubs (FCH) for Kabini and Temash are codenamed "Yangtze" and "Salton", respectively. The Yangtze FCH features support for two USB 3.0 ports, two SATA 6 Gbit/s ports, as well as the xHCI 1.0 and SD/SDIO 3.0 protocols for SD-card support. Both chips feature DirectX 11.1-compliant GCN-based graphics as well as numerous HSA improvements. They were fabricated at a 28 nm process in an FT3 ball grid array package by Taiwan Semiconductor Manufacturing Company (TSMC), and were released on 23 May 2013.

The PlayStation 4 and Xbox One were revealed to both be powered by 8-core semi-custom Jaguar-derived APUs.

==== Steamroller architecture (2014): Kaveri ====
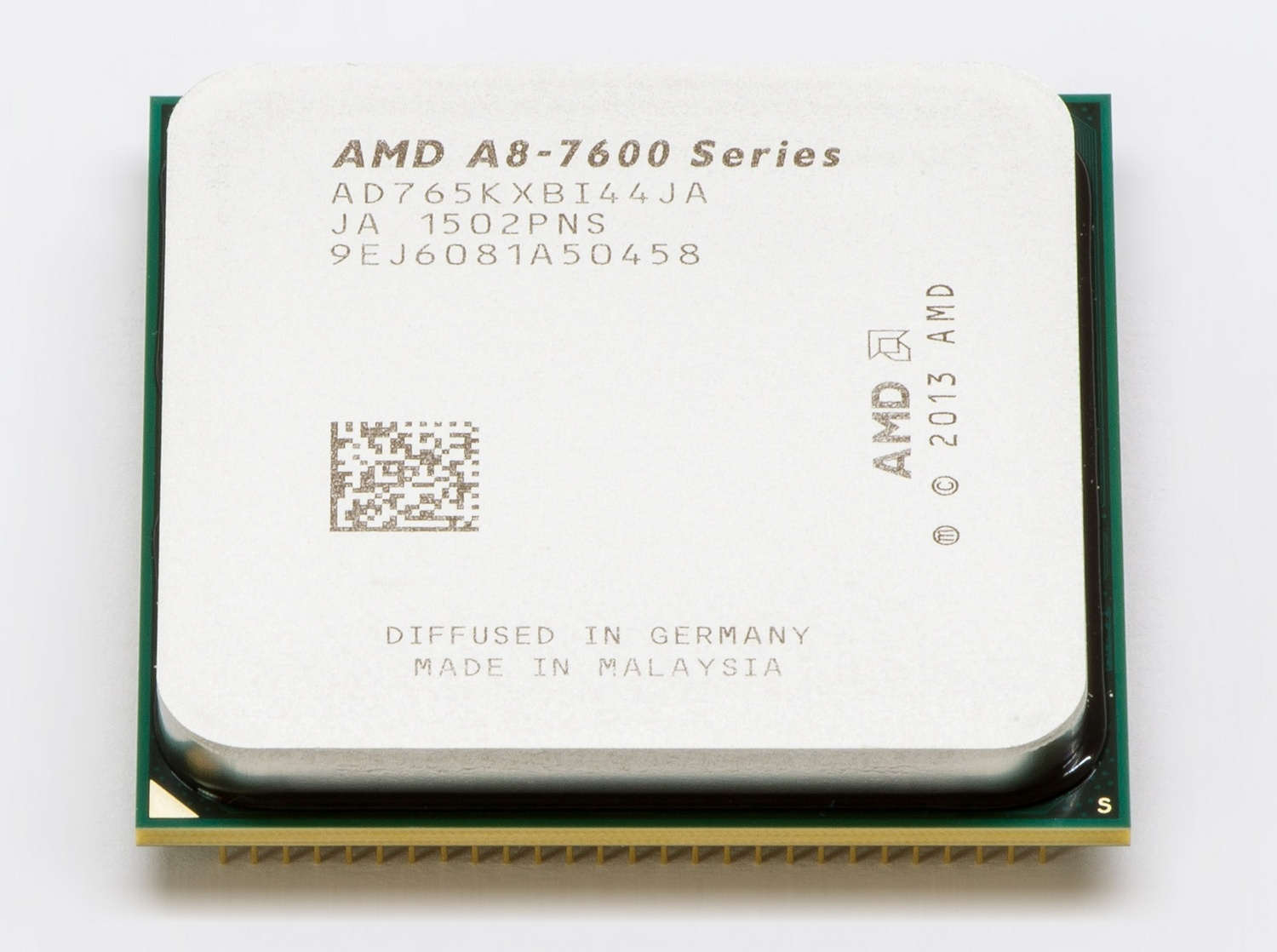
AMD A8-7650K (Kaveri)

- Steamroller-based CPU with 2–4 cores
- Graphics Core Next 2nd Gen-based GPU with 192–512 shader processors
- 15–95 W thermal design power
- Fastest mobile processor of this series: AMD FX-7600P (35 W)
- Fastest desktop processor of this series: AMD A10-7850K (95 W)
- Socket FM2+ and Socket FP3
- Target segment desktop and mobile
- Heterogeneous System Architecture-enabled zero-copying through pointer passing

The third generation of the platform, codenamed Kaveri, was partly released on 14 January 2014. Kaveri contains up to four Steamroller CPU cores clocked to 3.9 GHz with a turbo mode of 4.1 GHz, up to a 512-core Graphics Core Next GPU, two decode units per module instead of one (which allows each core to decode four instructions per cycle instead of two), AMD TrueAudio, Mantle API, an on-chip ARM Cortex-A5 MPCore, and will release with a new socket, FM2+. Ian Cutress and Rahul Garg of Anandtech asserted that Kaveri represented the unified system-on-a-chip realization of AMD's acquisition of ATI. The performance of the 45 W A8-7600 Kaveri APU was found to be similar to that of the 100 W Richland part, leading to the claim that AMD made significant improvements in on-die graphics performance per watt; however, CPU performance was found to lag behind similarly specified Intel processors, a lag that was unlikely to be resolved in the Bulldozer family APUs. The A8-7600 component was delayed from a Q1 launch to an H1 launch because the Steamroller architecture components allegedly did not scale well at higher clock speeds.

AMD announced the release of the Kaveri APU for the mobile market on 4 June 2014 at Computex 2014, shortly after the accidental announcement on the AMD website on 26 May 2014. The announcement included components targeted at the standard voltage, low-voltage, and ultra-low voltage segments of the market. In early-access performance testing of a Kaveri prototype laptop, AnandTech found that the 35 W FX-7600P was competitive with the similarly priced 17 W Intel i7-4500U in synthetic CPU-focused benchmarks, and was significantly better than previous integrated GPU systems on GPU-focused benchmarks. Tom's Hardware reported the performance of the Kaveri FX-7600P against the 35 W Intel i7-4702MQ, finding that the i7-4702MQ was significantly better than the FX-7600P in synthetic CPU-focused benchmarks, whereas the FX-7600P was significantly better than the i7-4702MQ's Intel HD 4600 iGPU in the four games that could be tested in the time available to the team.

==== Puma architecture (2014): Beema and Mullins ====
- Puma-based CPU
- Graphics Core Next 2nd Gen-based GPU with 128 shader processors
- Socket FT3
- Target segment ultra-mobile

==== Puma+ architecture (2015): Carrizo-L ====
- Puma+-based CPU with 2–4 cores
- Graphics Core Next 2nd Gen-based GPU with 128 shader processors
- 12–25 W configurable TDP
- Socket FP4 support; pin-compatible with Carrizo
- Target segment mobile and ultra-mobile

==== Excavator architecture (2015): Carrizo ====
- Excavator-based CPU with 4 cores
- Graphics Core Next 3rd Gen-based GPU
- Memory controller supports DDR3 SDRAM at 2133 MHz and DDR4 SDRAM at 1866 MHz
- 15–35 W configurable TDP (with the 15 W cTDP unit having reduced performance)
- Integrated southbridge
- Socket FP4
- Target segment mobile
- Announced by AMD on YouTube (19 November 2014)

==== Steamroller architecture (Q2–Q3 2015): Godavari ====
- Update of the desktop Kaveri series with higher clock frequencies or smaller power envelope
- Steamroller-based CPU with 4 cores
- Graphics Core Next 2nd Gen-based GPU
- Memory controller supports DDR3 SDRAM at 2133 MHz
- 65/95 W TDP with support for configurable TDP
- Socket FM2+
- Target segment desktop
- Listed since Q2 2015

==== Excavator architecture (2016): Bristol Ridge and Stoney Ridge ====
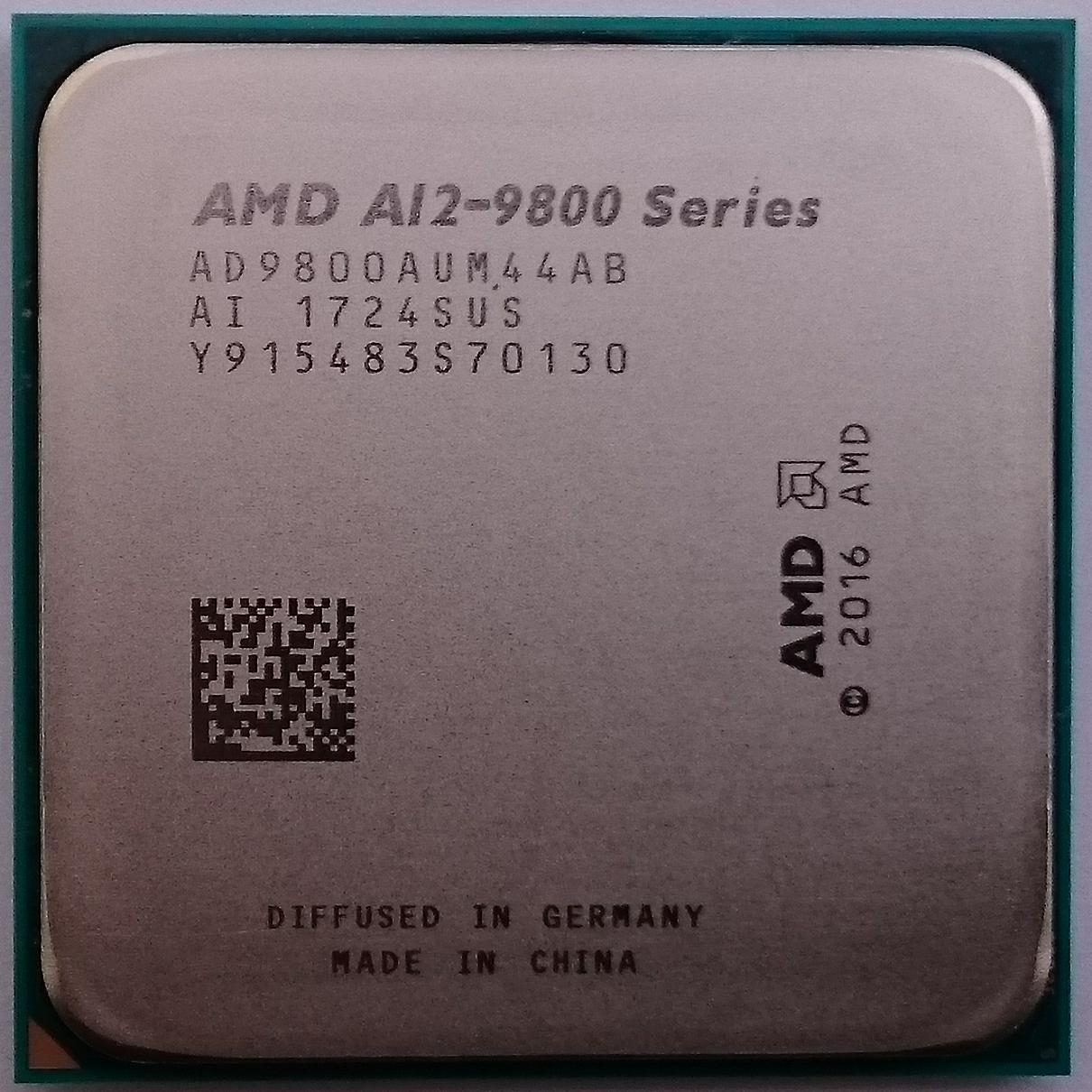
AMD A12-9800 (Bristol Ridge)

- Excavator-based CPU with 2–4 cores
- 1 MB L2 cache per module
- Graphics Core Next 3rd Gen-based GPU
- Memory controller supports DDR4 SDRAM
- 15/35/45/65 W TDP with support for configurable TDP
- 28 nm
- Socket AM4 for desktop
- Target segment desktop, mobile and ultra-mobile

==== Zen architecture (2017): Raven Ridge ====
- Zen-based CPU cores with simultaneous multithreading (SMT)
- 512 KB L2 cache per core
- 4 MB L3 cache
- Precision Boost 2
- Graphics Core Next 5th Gen "Vega"-based GPU
- Memory controller supports DDR4 SDRAM
- Video Core Next as successor of UVD+VCE
- 14 nm at GlobalFoundries
- Socket FP5 for mobile and AM4 for desktop
- Target segment desktop and mobile
- Listed since Q4 2017

==== Zen+ architecture (2018): Picasso ====
- Zen+-based CPU microarchitecture
- Refresh of Raven Ridge on 12 nm with improved latency and efficiency/clock frequency. Features similar to Raven Ridge
- Launched April 2018

==== Zen 2 architecture (2019): Renoir ====
- Zen 2-based CPU microarchitecture
- Graphics Core Next 5th Gen "Vega"-based GPU
- VCN 2.1
- Memory controller supports DDR4 and LPDDR4X SDRAM up to 4266 MHz
- 15 and 45 W TDP for mobile and 35 and 65 W TDP for desktop
- 7 nm at TSMC
- Socket FP6 for mobile and socket AM4 for desktop
- Release July 2019

==== Zen 3 architecture (2020): Cezanne ====
- Zen 3-based CPU microarchitecture
- Graphics Core Next 5th Gen "Vega"-based GPU
- Memory controller supports DDR4 and LPDDR4X SDRAM up to 4266 MHz
- Up to 45 W TDP for mobile; 35W to 65W TDP for desktop.
- 7 nm at TSMC
- Socket AM4 for desktop
- Socket FP6 for mobile
- Released for mobile early 2021 with desktop counterparts released in November 2020.

=== RDNA-based GPU ===
==== Zen 3+ architecture (2022): Rembrandt ====
- Zen 3+ based CPU microarchitecture
- RDNA 2-based GPU
- Memory controller supports DDR5-4800 and LPDDR5-6400
- Up to 45 W TDP for mobile
- Node: TSMC N6
- Socket FP7 for mobile
- Released for mobile early 2022

==== Zen 4 architecture (2023): Phoenix Point ====
- Zen 4 based CPU microarchitecture
- RDNA 3-based GPU with up to 12 CU
- Memory controller supports DDR5-5600 and LPDDR5x-7500
- XDNA-powered NPU with up to 16 TOPS
- Up to 54 W TDP for mobile
- Up to 65 W TDP for desktop
- Node: TSMC N4
- Sockets FP7, FP7r2 & FP8 for mobile
- Socket AM5 for desktop
- Released for mobiles early 2023
- Released for desktop early 2024

==== Zen 5 architecture (2024): Strix Point ====
- Zen 5 based CPU microarchitecture with a mix of Zen 5 and 5c cores
- RDNA 3.5-based GPU with up to 16 CU
- Memory controller supports DDR5-5600 and LPDDR5x-8000
- XDNA2-powered NPU with up to 55 TOPS
- Up to 54 W TDP for mobile
- Node: TSMC N4
- Socket FP8 for mobile
- Released for mobile early 2024

== See also ==
- List of AMD processors with 3D graphics
- Ryzen
- AMD mobile platform
- List of AMD mobile microprocessors
- Radeon
- Intel Graphics Technology
- List of Nvidia graphics processing units
