= Radeon X300-X600 series =

Series of graphics cards

ATI Radeon X300–X600 series
- Release date: 2004–2005
- Architecture: Radeon R300; Radeon R400
- Transistors: 76M 130nm (RV380); 107M 110nm (RV370); 120M 110nm (RV410)

Cards
- Entry-level: X300, X550, X600 SE, X600
- Mid-range: X550 XT, X600 PRO
- High-end: X550 XTX, X600 XT

API support
- Direct3D: Direct3D 9.0b Shader Model 2.0b
- OpenGL: OpenGL 2.0

History
- Predecessor: Radeon 9000 series
- Successor: Radeon X700 series

Support status
- Unsupported

ATI released the Radeon X300 and X600 boards. These were based on the RV370 (110 nm process) and RV380 (130 nm Low-K process) GPU respectively. They were nearly identical to the chips used in Radeon 9550 and 9600, only differing in that they were native PCI Express offerings. These were very popular for Dell and other OEM companies to sell in various configurations; connectors: DVI vs. DMS-59, card height: full-height vs. half-height.

Later the Radeon X550 was launched, using the same chip as Radeon X300 graphics card (RV370).

== Feature matrix ==
The following table shows features of AMD/ATI's GPUs (see also: List of AMD graphics processing units).

Name of GPU series	Wonder	Mach	3D Rage	Rage Pro	Rage 128	R100	R200	R300	R400	R500	R600	RV670	R700	Evergreen	Northern Islands		Southern Islands	Sea Islands	Volcanic Islands	Arctic Islands/Polaris	Vega	Navi 1x	Navi 2x	Navi 3x	Navi 4x
Released	1986	1991	Apr; 1996	Mar; 1997	Aug; 1998	Apr; 2000	Aug; 2001	Sep; 2002	May; 2004	Oct; 2005	May; 2007	Nov; 2007	Jun; 2008	Sep; 2009	Oct; 2010	Dec; 2010	Jan; 2012	Sep; 2013	Jun; 2015	Jun 2016, Apr 2017, Aug 2019	Jun 2017, Feb 2019	Jul; 2019	Nov; 2020	Dec; 2022	Feb; 2025
Marketing Name	Wonder	Mach	3D; Rage	Rage; Pro	Rage; 128	Radeon; 7000	Radeon; 8000	Radeon; 9000	Radeon; X700/X800	Radeon; X1000	Radeon; HD 2000	Radeon; HD 3000	Radeon; HD 4000	Radeon; HD 5000	Radeon; HD 6000		Radeon; HD 7000	Radeon; 200	Radeon; 300	Radeon; 400/500/600	Radeon; RX Vega, Radeon VII	Radeon; RX 5000	Radeon; RX 6000	Radeon; RX 7000	Radeon; RX 9000
AMD support	Ended																			Current					
Kind	2D		3D																						
Instruction set architecture	Not publicly known										TeraScale instruction set						GCN instruction set					RDNA instruction set			
Microarchitecture	Not publicly known					GFX1		GFX2			TeraScale 1 (VLIW5) (GFX3)			TeraScale 2 (VLIW5) (GFX4)	TeraScale 2 (VLIW5) up to 68xx (GFX4)	TeraScale 3 (VLIW4) in 69xx (GFX5)	GCN 1st gen (GFX6)	GCN 2nd gen (GFX7)	GCN 3rd gen (GFX8)	GCN 4th gen (GFX8)	GCN 5th gen (GFX9)	RDNA (GFX10.1)	RDNA 2 (GFX10.3)	RDNA 3 (GFX11)	RDNA 4 (GFX12)
Type	Fixed pipeline (Note: The Radeon R100 Series has programmable pixel shaders, but do not fully comply with DirectX 8 or Pixel Shader 1.0. See article on R100's pixel shaders.)						Programmable pixel & vertex pipelines				Unified shader model														
Direct3D	—N/a		5.0	6.0		7.0	8.1	9.0; 11 (9_2)	9.0b 11 (9_2)	9.0c 11 (9_3)	10.0; 11 (10_0)	10.1; 11 (10_1)		11 (11_0)			11 (11_1); 12 (11_1)	11 (12_0); 12 (12_0)			11 (12_1); 12 (12_1)		11 (12_1); 12 (12_2)		
Shader model	—N/a						1.4	2.0+	2.0b	3.0	4.0	4.1		5.0			5.1	5.1; 6.5			6.7				6.8
OpenGL	—N/a			1.1	1.2	1.3		1.5 (Note: R300, R400 and R500 based cards do not fully comply with OpenGL 2+ as the hardware does not support all types of non-power of two (NPOT) textures.)			3.3			4.5 (Windows), 4.6 (Linux Mesa 25.2+)			4.6 (Note: OpenGL 4+ compliance requires supporting FP64 shaders and these are emulated on some TeraScale chips using 32-bit hardware.)								
Vulkan	—N/a															1.1 (Note: Vulkan support is theoretically possible but has not been implemented in a stable driver.)	1.3 (Note: Vulkan support in Linux relies on the AMDgpu kernel driver, the radeon driver does not support Vulkan.)		1.4						
OpenCL	—N/a										Close to Metal		1.1 (not supported by Mesa)	1.2+ (on Linux: 1.1+ (no Image support on Clover, with Rusticl) with Mesa, 1.2+ on GCN 1.Gen)				2.0+ (Adrenalin driver on Win 7+) (on Linux ROCm, Mesa 1.2+ (no support in Clover, only Rusticl, Mesa, 2.0+ and 3.0 with AMD drivers or AMD ROCm), 5th gen: 2.2 win 10+ and Linux RocM 5.0+				2.2+ and 3.0 Windows 8.1+ and Linux ROCm 5.0+ (Mesa Rusticl 1.2+ and 3.0 (2.1+ and 2.2+))			
HSA / ROCm	—N/a																Yes					?			
Video decoding ASIC	—N/a										Avivo/UVD	UVD+	UVD 2	UVD 2.2	UVD 3		UVD 4	UVD 4.2	UVD 5.0 or 6.0	UVD 6.3	UVD 7 (Note: The UVD and VCE were replaced by the Video Core Next (VCN) ASIC in the Raven Ridge APU implementation of Vega.)	VCN 2.0	VCN 3.0	VCN 4.0	VCN 5.0
Video encoding ASIC	—N/a																VCE 1.0	VCE 2.0	VCE 3.0 or 3.1	VCE 3.4	VCE 4.0	VCN 2.0	VCN 3.0	VCN 4.0	VCN 5.0
Fluid Motion (Note: Video processing for video frame rate interpolation technique. In Windows it works as a DirectShow filter in your player. In Linux, there is no support on the part of drivers and / or community.)	No																	Yes				No		?	
Power saving	?										PowerPlay				PowerTune		PowerTune & ZeroCore Power					?			
TrueAudio	—N/a																	Via dedicated DSP		Via shaders					
FreeSync	—N/a																	1; 2							
HDCP (Note: To play protected video content, it also requires card, operating system, driver, and application support. A compatible HDCP display is also needed for this. HDCP is mandatory for the output of certain audio formats, placing additional constraints on the multimedia setup.)	—N/a										?							1.4		2.2		2.3			
PlayReady	—N/a																			3.0	No	3.0			
Supported displays (Note: More displays may be supported with native DisplayPort connections, or splitting the maximum resolution between multiple monitors with active converters.)						1–2	2							2–6								?			4
Max. resolution	?													2–6 × 2560×1600			2–6 × 4096×2160 @ 30 Hz			2–6 × 5120×2880 @ 60 Hz	3 × 7680×4320 @ 60 Hz	7680×4320 @ 60 Hz PowerColor		7680x4320 @165 Hz	7680x4320
/drm/radeon (Note: DRM (Direct Rendering Manager) is a component of the Linux kernel. AMDgpu is the Linux kernel module. Support in this table refers to the most current version.)						Yes													—N/a						
/drm/amdgpu	—N/a																Yes Kernel 6.19+		Yes						

== X300-X600 series ==
- All models include DirectX 9.0 and OpenGL 2.0
- All models use a PCI-E x16 interface

Model	Launch	Code name	Fab (nm)	Memory (MiB)	Core clock (MHz)	Memory clock (MHz)	Config core^{1}	Fillrate				Memory		
Model	Launch	Code name	Fab (nm)	Memory (MiB)	Core clock (MHz)	Memory clock (MHz)	Config core^{1}	MOperations/s	MPixels/s	MTexels/s	MVertices/s	Bandwidth (GB/s)	Bus type	Bus width (bit)
Radeon X300	June 21, 2004	RV370 (hari)	110	64, 128	325	400	4:2:4:4	1300	1300	1300	162.5	6.4	DDR	128
Radeon X300 LE	June 21, 2004	RV370 (hari)	110	64, 128	325	400	4:2:4:4	1300	1300	1300	162.5	6.4	DDR	128
Radeon X300 SE	June 21, 2004	RV370 (hari)	110	64, 128	325	400	4:2:4:4	1300	1300	1300	162.5	3.2	DDR	64
Radeon X300 SE HyperMemory	April 4, 2005	RV370 (hari)	110	32, 64, 128 onboard + up to 128 system	325	600	4:2:4:4	1300	1300	1300	162.5	3.2	DDR	64
Radeon X550	June 21, 2005	RV370 (hari)	110	128, 256	400	500	4:2:4:4	1600	1600	1600	200	8	DDR	128
Radeon X550 XT	Jan 24, 2007	RV410	110	128, 256	400	300	4:6:4:4	1600	1600	1600	600	9.6	GDDR3	128
Radeon X550 XTX	Jan 24, 2007	RV410	110	128, 256	400	300	8:6:8:8	3200	3200	3200	600	9.6	GDDR3	128
Radeon X600 SE	September 1, 2004	RV370	110	128	325	250	4:2:4:4	1300	1300	1300	163	4.0	DDR	64
Radeon X600	September 1, 2004	RV370	110	256	400	250	4:2:4:4	1600	1600	1600	200	8.0	DDR	128
Radeon X600 PRO	June 21, 2004	RV380	130	128, 256	400	300	4:2:4:4	1600	1600	1600	200	9.6	DDR	128
Radeon X600 XT	June 21, 2004	RV380	130	128, 256	500	370	4:2:4:4	2000	2000	2000	250	11.84	DDR	128

- ^{1} Pixel shaders : Vertex shaders : Texture mapping units : Render output units

== See also ==
- List of AMD graphics processing units
- Free and open-source device drivers: graphics#ATI.2FAMD
