= Radeon X800 series =

GPU series by ATI Technologies

ATI Radeon X800 series
- Release date: May 4, 2004; 20 years ago
- Codename: Loki
- Architecture: Radeon R400
- Transistors: 160M 130nm (R420): 160M 130nm (R423); 160M 110nm (R430); 160M 130nm (R480); 160M 130nm (R481)

Cards
- Entry-level: X800 SE, X800, X800 GT
- Mid-range: X800 GTO, X800 PRO, X800 XL, X850 PRO
- High-end: X800 XT, X850 XT
- Enthusiast: X800 XT PE, X850 XT PE

API support
- DirectX: Direct3D 9.0b Shader Model 2.0b
- OpenGL: OpenGL 2.0

History
- Predecessor: Radeon X700 series
- Successor: Radeon X1000 series

Support status
- Unsupported

Radeon X800 is a series of graphics cards designed by ATI Technologies Inc. introduced in May 2004.

== History of Radeon X800 ==
The Radeon X800 series was designed to take the position X700 XT failed to secure, with 12 pipelines and a 256-bit RAM bus. The card surpassed the 6600GT with performance similar to that of the GeForce 6800. The new X800 XL, a similar product, was positioned to dethrone NVIDIA's GeForce 6800 GT with higher memory speeds and a full 16 pipelines to boost performance. R430 was unable to reach high clock speeds, having been designed to reduce the cost per GPU, creating a need for new top-of-the-line core. The new high-end R4x0-generation arrived with the X850 series, equipped with various core tweaks for slightly higher performance than the "R420"-based X800 series. The "R480"-based X850 line was available in 3 forms: the X850 Pro, the X850 XT, and the X850 XT Platinum Edition, and was built on the reliable high-performance 130 nanometer Low-K process.

== Radeon Feature Matrix ==
The following table shows features of AMD/ATI's GPUs (see also: List of AMD graphics processing units).

Name of GPU series	Wonder	Mach	3D Rage	Rage Pro	Rage 128	R100	R200	R300	R400	R500	R600	RV670	R700	Evergreen	Northern Islands		Southern Islands	Sea Islands	Volcanic Islands	Arctic Islands/Polaris	Vega	Navi 1x	Navi 2x	Navi 3x	Navi 4x
Released	1986	1991	Apr; 1996	Mar; 1997	Aug; 1998	Apr; 2000	Aug; 2001	Sep; 2002	May; 2004	Oct; 2005	May; 2007	Nov; 2007	Jun; 2008	Sep; 2009	Oct; 2010	Dec; 2010	Jan; 2012	Sep; 2013	Jun; 2015	Jun 2016, Apr 2017, Aug 2019	Jun 2017, Feb 2019	Jul; 2019	Nov; 2020	Dec; 2022	Feb; 2025
Marketing Name	Wonder	Mach	3D; Rage	Rage; Pro	Rage; 128	Radeon; 7000	Radeon; 8000	Radeon; 9000	Radeon; X700/X800	Radeon; X1000	Radeon; HD 2000	Radeon; HD 3000	Radeon; HD 4000	Radeon; HD 5000	Radeon; HD 6000		Radeon; HD 7000	Radeon; 200	Radeon; 300	Radeon; 400/500/600	Radeon; RX Vega, Radeon VII	Radeon; RX 5000	Radeon; RX 6000	Radeon; RX 7000	Radeon; RX 9000
AMD support	Ended																			Current					
Kind	2D		3D																						
Instruction set architecture	Not publicly known										TeraScale instruction set						GCN instruction set					RDNA instruction set			
Microarchitecture	Not publicly known					GFX1		GFX2			TeraScale 1 (VLIW5) (GFX3)			TeraScale 2 (VLIW5) (GFX4)	TeraScale 2 (VLIW5) up to 68xx (GFX4)	TeraScale 3 (VLIW4) in 69xx (GFX5)	GCN 1st gen (GFX6)	GCN 2nd gen (GFX7)	GCN 3rd gen (GFX8)	GCN 4th gen (GFX8)	GCN 5th gen (GFX9)	RDNA (GFX10.1)	RDNA 2 (GFX10.3)	RDNA 3 (GFX11)	RDNA 4 (GFX12)
Type	Fixed pipeline (Note: The Radeon 100 Series has programmable pixel shaders, but do not fully comply with DirectX 8 or Pixel Shader 1.0. See article on R100's pixel shaders.)						Programmable pixel & vertex pipelines				Unified shader model														
Direct3D	—		5.0	6.0		7.0	8.1	9.0; 11 (9_2)	9.0b 11 (9_2)	9.0c 11 (9_3)	10.0; 11 (10_0)	10.1; 11 (10_1)		11 (11_0)			11 (11_1); 12 (11_1)	11 (12_0); 12 (12_0)			11 (12_1); 12 (12_1)		11 (12_1); 12 (12_2)		
Shader model	—						1.4	2.0+	2.0b	3.0	4.0	4.1		5.0			5.1	5.1; 6.5			6.7				6.8
OpenGL	—			1.1	1.2	1.3		2.1 (Note: R300, R400 and R500 based cards do not fully comply with OpenGL 2+ as the hardware does not support all types of non-power of two (NPOT) textures.)			3.3			4.5 (Note: OpenGL 4+ compliance requires supporting FP64 shaders and these are emulated on some TeraScale chips using 32-bit hardware.)			4.6								
Vulkan	—															1.1	1.3		1.4						
OpenCL	—										Close to Metal		1.1 (not supported by Mesa)	1.2+ (on Linux: 1.1+ (no Image support on clover, with by rustiCL) with Mesa, 1.2+ on GCN 1.Gen)				2.0+ (Adrenalin driver on Win7+) (on Linux ROCM, Mesa 1.2+ (no Image support in clover, but in rustiCL with Mesa, 2.0+ and 3.0 with AMD drivers or AMD ROCm), 5th gen: 2.2 win 10+ and Linux RocM 5.0+				2.2+ and 3.0 windows 8.1+ and Linux ROCM 5.0+ (Mesa rustiCL 1.2+ and 3.0 (2.1+ and 2.2+ wip))			
HSA / ROCm	—																Yes					?			
Video decoding ASIC	—										Avivo/UVD	UVD+	UVD 2	UVD 2.2	UVD 3		UVD 4	UVD 4.2	UVD 5.0 or 6.0	UVD 6.3	UVD 7 (Note: The UVD and VCE were replaced by the Video Core Next (VCN) ASIC in the Raven Ridge APU implementation of Vega.)	VCN 2.0	VCN 3.0	VCN 4.0	VCN 5.0
Video encoding ASIC	—																VCE 1.0	VCE 2.0	VCE 3.0 or 3.1	VCE 3.4	VCE 4.0	VCN 2.0	VCN 3.0	VCN 4.0	VCN 5.0
Fluid Motion (Note: Video processing for video frame rate interpolation technique. In Windows it works as a DirectShow filter in your player. In Linux, there is no support on the part of drivers and / or community.)	No																	Yes				No		?	
Power saving	?										PowerPlay				PowerTune		PowerTune & ZeroCore Power					?			
TrueAudio	—																	Via dedicated DSP		Via shaders					
FreeSync	—																	1; 2							
HDCP (Note: To play protected video content, it also requires card, operating system, driver, and application support. A compatible HDCP display is also needed for this. HDCP is mandatory for the output of certain audio formats, placing additional constraints on the multimedia setup.)	—										?							1.4		2.2		2.3			
PlayReady	—																			3.0	No	3.0			
Supported displays (Note: More displays may be supported with native DisplayPort connections, or splitting the maximum resolution between multiple monitors with active converters.)						1–2	2							2–6								?			4
Max. resolution	?													2–6 × 2560×1600			2–6 × 4096×2160 @ 30 Hz			2–6 × 5120×2880 @ 60 Hz	3 × 7680×4320 @ 60 Hz	7680×4320 @ 60 Hz PowerColor		7680x4320 @165 Hz	7680x4320
/drm/radeon (Note: DRM (Direct Rendering Manager) is a component of the Linux kernel. AMDgpu is the Linux kernel module. Support in this table refers to the most current version.)						Yes													—						
/drm/amdgpu	—																	Optional	Yes						

== Radeon X800 series ==
=== AGP (X8xx) ===
- All models include AGP 8x
- All models include DirectX 9.0b and OpenGL 2.0

Model	Launch	Code name	Fab (nm)	Memory (MiB)	Core clock (MHz)	Memory clock (MHz)	Config core^{1}	Fillrate				Memory		
Model	Launch	Code name	Fab (nm)	Memory (MiB)	Core clock (MHz)	Memory clock (MHz)	Config core^{1}	MOperations/s	MPixels/s	MTexels/s	MVertices/s	Bandwidth (GB/s)	Bus type	Bus width (bit)
Radeon X800 SE	Oct. 2004	R420 (loki)	130	256	425	800	8:6:8:8	3400	6800	3400	637,5	25.6	GDDR3	256
Radeon X800 GT	Dec. 6, 2005	R420 (loki)	130	256	475	980	8:6:8:16	3800	7600	3800	712.5	31.36	GDDR3	256
Radeon X800	Dec. 2004	R430	110	256	400	700	12:6:12:16	4800	6400	4800	600	22.4	GDDR3	256
Radeon X800 GTO	Dec. 6, 2005	R420 (loki)	130	256	400	980	12:6:12:16	4800	6400	4800	600	31.36	GDDR3	256
Radeon X800 Pro	May 5, 2004	R420 (loki)	130	256	475	900	12:6:12:16	5700	7600	5700	712.5	28.8	GDDR3	256
Radeon X800 XL	Feb. 2, 2005	R430	110	256	400	980	16:6:16:16	6400	6400	6400	600	31.36	GDDR3	256
Radeon X800 XT	May 4, 2004	R420 (loki)	130	256	500	1000	16:6:16:16	8000	8000	8000	750	32	GDDR3	256
Radeon X800 XT PE	May 4, 2004	R420 (loki)	130	256	520	1120	16:6:16:16	8320	8320	8320	780	35.84	GDDR3	256
Radeon X850 Pro	Feb. 28, 2005	R481	130	256	507	1040	12:6:12:16	6084	8112	6084	760.5	33.28	GDDR3	256
Radeon X850 XT	Feb. 28, 2005	R481	130	256	520	1080	16:6:16:16	8320	8320	8320	780	34.56	GDDR3	256
Radeon X850 XT PE	Feb. 28, 2005	R481	130	256	540	1180	16:6:16:16	8640	8640	8640	810	37.76	GDDR3	256

- ^{1} Pixel shaders : Vertex shaders : Texture mapping units : Render output units

=== PCI-E (X8xx) ===
- All models include PCI-E x16, DirectX 9.0b and OpenGL 2.0

Model	Launch	Code name	Fab (nm)	Memory (MiB)	Core clock (MHz)	Memory clock (MHz)	Config core^{1}	Fillrate				Memory		
Model	Launch	Code name	Fab (nm)	Memory (MiB)	Core clock (MHz)	Memory clock (MHz)	Config core^{1}	MOperations/s	MPixels/s	MTexels/s	MVertices/s	Bandwidth (GB/s)	Bus type	Bus width (bit)
Radeon X800 GT 128MB	Aug. 1, 2005	R423; R480 (thor)	130	128	475	350	8:6:8:16	3800	7600	3800	712.5	22.4	DDR	256
Radeon X800 GT 256MB	Aug. 1, 2005	R423; R480 (thor)	130	256	475	980	8:6:8:16	3800	7600	3800	712.5	31.36	GDDR3	256
Radeon X800	Dec. 1, 2004	R430 (thor)	110	128, 256	392	700	12:6:12:16	4704	6272	4704	588	22.4	GDDR3	256
Radeon X800 GTO 128MB	Sept. 15, 2005	R423; R480; R430 (thor)	130; 110	128	400	700	12:6:12:16	4800	6400	4800	600	22.4	GDDR3	256
Radeon X800 GTO 256MB	Sept. 15, 2005	R423; R480; R430 (thor)	130; 110	256	400	980	12:6:12:16	4800	6400	4800	600	31.36	GDDR3	256
Radeon X800 Pro	May 5, 2004	R423 (thor)	130	256	475	900	12:6:12:16	5700	7600	5700	712.5	28.8	GDDR3	256
Radeon X800 XL	Dec. 1, 2004 (256 MB); May 4, 2005 (512 MB)	R430 (thor)	110	256, 512	400	980	16:6:16:16	6400	6400	6400	600	31.36	GDDR3	256
Radeon X800 XT	Dec. 1, 2004	R423 (thor)	130	256	500	1000	16:6:16:16	8000	8000	8000	750	32	GDDR3	256
Radeon X800 XT Platinum Edition	N/A	R423 (thor)	130	256	520	1120	16:6:16:16	8320	8320	8320	780	35.84	GDDR3	256
Radeon X850 Pro	Dec. 1, 2004	R480 (thor)	130	256	507	1040	12:6:12:16	6084	8112	6084	760.5	33.28	GDDR3	256
Radeon X850 XT	Dec. 1, 2004	R480 (thor)	130	256	520	1080	16:6:16:16	8320	8320	8320	780	34.56	GDDR3	256
Radeon X850 XT CrossFire Master	Sept. 29, 2004	R480 (thor)	130	256	520	1080	16:6:16:16	8320	8320	8320	780	34.56	GDDR3	256
Radeon X850 XT Platinum Edition	Dec. 21, 2004	R480 (thor)	130	256	540	1180	16:6:16:16	8640	8640	8640	810	37.76	GDDR3	256

- ^{1} Pixel shaders : Vertex shaders : Texture mapping units : Render output units

== See also ==
- List of AMD graphics processing units
- Free and open-source device drivers: graphics#ATI.2FAMD
