= Radeon X700 series =

GPU series by ATI Technologies

ATI Radeon X700 series
- Release date: 2004-2005
- Architecture: Radeon R400
- Transistors: 120M 110nm (RV410)

Cards
- Entry-level: X700 SE, X700 LE, X700
- Mid-range: X700 PRO
- High-end: X740 XL

API support
- Direct3D: Direct3D 9.0b Shader Model 2.0b
- OpenGL: OpenGL 2.0

History
- Predecessor: Radeon X300-X600 series
- Successor: Radeon X800 series

Support status
- Unsupported

The Radeon X700 (RV410) series replaced the X600 in September 2004. X700 Pro is clocked at 425 MHz core, and produced on a 0.11 micrometre process. RV410 used a layout consisting of 8 pixel pipelines connected to 4 ROPs (similar to GeForce 6600) while maintaining the 6 vertex shaders of X800. The 110 nm process was a cost-cutting process, designed not for high clock speeds but for reducing die size while maintaining high yields. An X700 XT was planned for production, and reviewed by various hardware web sites, but was never released. It was believed that X700 XT set too high of a clock ceiling for ATI to profitably produce. X700 XT was also not adequately competitive with nVidia's impressive GeForce 6600GT. ATI would go on produce a card in the X800 series to compete instead.

== Radeon Feature Matrix ==
The following table shows features of AMD/ATI's GPUs (see also: List of AMD graphics processing units).

| Name of GPU series | Wonder | Mach | 3D Rage | Rage Pro | Rage 128 | R100 | R200 | R300 | R400 | R500 | R600 | RV670 | R700 | Evergreen | Northern Islands | | Southern Islands | Sea Islands | Volcanic Islands | Arctic Islands/Polaris | Vega | Navi 1x | Navi 2x | Navi 3x | Navi 4x |
|---|---|---|---|---|---|---|---|---|---|---|---|---|---|---|---|---|---|---|---|---|---|---|---|---|---|
| Released | 1986 | 1991 | Apr; 1996 | Mar; 1997 | Aug; 1998 | Apr; 2000 | Aug; 2001 | Sep; 2002 | May; 2004 | Oct; 2005 | May; 2007 | Nov; 2007 | Jun; 2008 | Sep; 2009 | Oct; 2010 | Dec; 2010 | Jan; 2012 | Sep; 2013 | Jun; 2015 | Jun 2016, Apr 2017, Aug 2019 | Jun 2017, Feb 2019 | Jul; 2019 | Nov; 2020 | Dec; 2022 | Feb; 2025 |
| Marketing Name | Wonder | Mach | 3D; Rage | Rage; Pro | Rage; 128 | Radeon; 7000 | Radeon; 8000 | Radeon; 9000 | Radeon; X700/X800 | Radeon; X1000 | Radeon; HD 2000 | Radeon; HD 3000 | Radeon; HD 4000 | Radeon; HD 5000 | Radeon; HD 6000 | | Radeon; HD 7000 | Radeon; 200 | Radeon; 300 | Radeon; 400/500/600 | Radeon; RX Vega, Radeon VII | Radeon; RX 5000 | Radeon; RX 6000 | Radeon; RX 7000 | Radeon; RX 9000 |
| AMD support | Ended | | | | | | | | | | | | | | | | | | | Current | | | | | |
| Kind | 2D | | 3D | | | | | | | | | | | | | | | | | | | | | | |
| Instruction set architecture | Not publicly known | | | | | | | | | | TeraScale instruction set | | | | | | GCN instruction set | | | | | RDNA instruction set | | | |
| Microarchitecture | Not publicly known | | | | | GFX1 | | GFX2 | | | TeraScale 1 (VLIW5) (GFX3) | | | TeraScale 2 (VLIW5) (GFX4) | TeraScale 2 (VLIW5) up to 68xx (GFX4) | TeraScale 3 (VLIW4) in 69xx (GFX5) | GCN 1st gen (GFX6) | GCN 2nd gen (GFX7) | GCN 3rd gen (GFX8) | GCN 4th gen (GFX8) | GCN 5th gen (GFX9) | RDNA (GFX10.1) | RDNA 2 (GFX10.3) | RDNA 3 (GFX11) | RDNA 4 (GFX12) |
| Type | Fixed pipeline (Note: The Radeon R100 Series has programmable pixel shaders, but do not fully comply with DirectX 8 or Pixel Shader 1.0. See article on R100's pixel shaders.) | | | | | | Programmable pixel & vertex pipelines | | | | Unified shader model | | | | | | | | | | | | | | |
| Direct3D | —N/a | | 5.0 | 6.0 | | 7.0 | 8.1 | 9.0; 11 (9_2) | 9.0b 11 (9_2) | 9.0c 11 (9_3) | 10.0; 11 (10_0) | 10.1; 11 (10_1) | | 11 (11_0) | | | 11 (11_1); 12 (11_1) | 11 (12_0); 12 (12_0) | | | 11 (12_1); 12 (12_1) | | 11 (12_1); 12 (12_2) | | |
| Shader model | —N/a | | | | | | 1.4 | 2.0+ | 2.0b | 3.0 | 4.0 | 4.1 | | 5.0 | | | 5.1 | 5.1; 6.5 | | | 6.7 | | | | 6.8 |
| OpenGL | —N/a | | | 1.1 | 1.2 | 1.3 | | 1.5 (Note: R300, R400 and R500 based cards do not fully comply with OpenGL 2+ as the hardware does not support all types of non-power of two (NPOT) textures.) | | | 3.3 | | | 4.5 (Windows), 4.6 (Linux Mesa 25.2+) | | | 4.6 (Note: OpenGL 4+ compliance requires supporting FP64 shaders and these are emulated on some TeraScale chips using 32-bit hardware.) | | | | | | | | |
| Vulkan | —N/a | | | | | | | | | | | | | | | 1.1 (Note: Vulkan support is theoretically possible but has not been implemented in a stable driver.) | 1.3 (Note: Vulkan support in Linux relies on the AMDgpu kernel driver, the radeon driver does not support Vulkan.) | | 1.4 | | | | | | |
| OpenCL | —N/a | | | | | | | | | | Close to Metal | | 1.1 (not supported by Mesa) | 1.2+ (on Linux: 1.1+ (no Image support on Clover, with Rusticl) with Mesa, 1.2+ on GCN 1.Gen) | | | | 2.0+ (Adrenalin driver on Win 7+) (on Linux ROCm, Mesa 1.2+ (no support in Clover, only Rusticl, Mesa, 2.0+ and 3.0 with AMD drivers or AMD ROCm), 5th gen: 2.2 win 10+ and Linux RocM 5.0+ | | | | 2.2+ and 3.0 Windows 8.1+ and Linux ROCm 5.0+ (Mesa Rusticl 1.2+ and 3.0 (2.1+ and 2.2+)) | | | |
| HSA / ROCm | —N/a | | | | | | | | | | | | | | | | Yes | | | | | ? | | | |
| Video decoding ASIC | —N/a | | | | | | | | | | Avivo/UVD | UVD+ | UVD 2 | UVD 2.2 | UVD 3 | | UVD 4 | UVD 4.2 | UVD 5.0 or 6.0 | UVD 6.3 | UVD 7 (Note: The UVD and VCE were replaced by the Video Core Next (VCN) ASIC in the Raven Ridge APU implementation of Vega.) | VCN 2.0 | VCN 3.0 | VCN 4.0 | VCN 5.0 |
| Video encoding ASIC | —N/a | | | | | | | | | | | | | | | | VCE 1.0 | VCE 2.0 | VCE 3.0 or 3.1 | VCE 3.4 | VCE 4.0 | VCN 2.0 | VCN 3.0 | VCN 4.0 | VCN 5.0 |
| Fluid Motion (Note: Video processing for video frame rate interpolation technique. In Windows it works as a DirectShow filter in your player. In Linux, there is no support on the part of drivers and / or community.) | No | | | | | | | | | | | | | | | | | Yes | | | | No | | ? | |
| Power saving | ? | | | | | | | | | | PowerPlay | | | | PowerTune | | PowerTune & ZeroCore Power | | | | | ? | | | |
| TrueAudio | —N/a | | | | | | | | | | | | | | | | | Via dedicated DSP | | Via shaders | | | | | |
| FreeSync | —N/a | | | | | | | | | | | | | | | | | 1; 2 | | | | | | | |
| HDCP (Note: To play protected video content, it also requires card, operating system, driver, and application support. A compatible HDCP display is also needed for this. HDCP is mandatory for the output of certain audio formats, placing additional constraints on the multimedia setup.) | —N/a | | | | | | | | | | ? | | | | | | | 1.4 | | 2.2 | | 2.3 | | | |
| PlayReady | —N/a | | | | | | | | | | | | | | | | | | | 3.0 | No | 3.0 | | | |
| Supported displays (Note: More displays may be supported with native DisplayPort connections, or splitting the maximum resolution between multiple monitors with active converters.) | | | | | | 1–2 | 2 | | | | | | | 2–6 | | | | | | | | ? | | | 4 |
| Max. resolution | ? | | | | | | | | | | | | | 2–6 × 2560×1600 | | | 2–6 × 4096×2160 @ 30 Hz | | | 2–6 × 5120×2880 @ 60 Hz | 3 × 7680×4320 @ 60 Hz | 7680×4320 @ 60 Hz PowerColor | | 7680x4320 @165 Hz | 7680x4320 |
| /drm/radeon (Note: DRM (Direct Rendering Manager) is a component of the Linux kernel. AMDgpu is the Linux kernel module. Support in this table refers to the most current version.) | | | | | | Yes | | | | | | | | | | | | | —N/a | | | | | | |
| /drm/amdgpu | —N/a | | | | | | | | | | | | | | | | Yes Kernel 6.19+ | | Yes | | | | | | |

== Radeon R400 series ==
=== AGP (X7xx, X8xx) ===
- All models include AGP 8x
- All models include DirectX 9.0b and OpenGL 2.0

| Model | Launch | Code name | Fab (nm) | Memory (MiB) | Core clock (MHz) | Memory clock (MHz) | Config core^{1} | Fillrate | | | | Memory | | |
| Model | Launch | Code name | Fab (nm) | Memory (MiB) | Core clock (MHz) | Memory clock (MHz) | Config core^{1} | MOperations/s | MPixels/s | MTexels/s | MVertices/s | Bandwidth (GB/s) | Bus type | Bus width (bit) |
|---|---|---|---|---|---|---|---|---|---|---|---|---|---|---|
| Radeon X700 | Sept. 2005 | RV410 (alto) | 110 | 128, 256 | 400 | 700 | 8:6:8:8 | 3200 | 3200 | 3200 | 600 | 11.2 | DDR | 128 |
| Radeon X700 Pro | March 1, 2005 | RV410 (alto) | 110 | 128, 256 | 425 | 864 | 8:6:8:8 | 3400 | 3400 | 3400 | 637.5 | 13.824 | GDDR3 | 128 |

- ^{1} Pixel shaders : Vertex shaders : Texture mapping units : Render output units

=== PCI-E (X7xx) ===
- All models include PCI-E x16
- All models include DirectX 9.0b and OpenGL 2.0

| Model | Launch | Code name | Fab (nm) | Memory (MiB) | Core clock (MHz) | Memory clock (MHz) | Config core^{1} | Fillrate | | | | Memory | | |
| Model | Launch | Code name | Fab (nm) | Memory (MiB) | Core clock (MHz) | Memory clock (MHz) | Config core^{1} | MOperations/s | MPixels/s | MTexels/s | MVertices/s | Bandwidth (GB/s) | Bus type | Bus width (bit) |
|---|---|---|---|---|---|---|---|---|---|---|---|---|---|---|
| Radeon X700 SE | Apr. 1, 2005 | RV410 (alto) | 110 | 128 | 400 | 400; 500 | 4:6:4:8 | 1600 | 3200 | 1600 | 600 | 3.2 | DDR | 64 |
| Radeon X700 LE | Dec. 21, 2004 | RV410 (alto) | 110 | 128 | 400 | 500 | 8:6:8:8 | 3200 | 3200 | 3200 | 600 | 4 | DDR | 64 |
| Radeon X700 | Sept. 2005 | RV410 (alto) | 110 | 128, 256 | 400 | 500; 700 | 8:6:8:8 | 3200 | 3200 | 3200 | 600 | 8; 11.2 | DDR | 128 |
| Radeon X700 Pro | Dec. 21, 2004 | RV410 (alto) | 110 | 128, 256 | 425 | 864 | 8:6:8:8 | 3400 | 3400 | 3400 | 637.5 | 13.824 | GDDR3 | 128 |
| Radeon X700 XT | Never Released | RV410 (alto) | 110 | 128, 256 | 475 | 1050 | 8:6:8:8 | 3800 | 3800 | 3800 | 712.5 | 16.8 | GDDR3 | 128 |

- ^{1} Pixel shaders : Vertex shaders : Texture mapping units : Render output units

== See also ==
- List of AMD graphics processing units
- Free_and_open-source_device_drivers:_graphics#ATI.2FAMD
