= Radeon 600 series =

Series of video cards

AMD Radeon 600 series
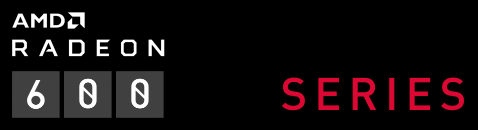
- Release date: August 13, 2019 (6 years ago)
- Codename: Polaris
- Architecture: GCN 1st gen GCN 3rd gen GCN 4th gen
- Transistors: 690M (Banks) 28 nm; 1.550M (Polaris 24) 28 nm; 2.200M (Polaris 23) 14 nm
- Fabrication process: TSMC 28 nm (CMOS); Samsung/GloFo 14 nm (FinFET)

Cards
- Entry-level: Radeon 610; Radeon 620; Radeon 625; Radeon 630; Radeon RX 640

API support
- Direct3D: Direct3D 12.0 (feature level 12_0 or 11_1 on GCN 1st gen); Shader Model 6.7 (GCN 4th gen) or Shader Model 6.5
- OpenCL: OpenCL 2.1
- OpenGL: OpenGL 4.6
- Vulkan: Vulkan 1.2 (GCN 1st gen and GCN 3rd gen for Windows); Vulkan 1.3 (GCN 4th gen for Windows, GCN 1st gen or newer for Linux); SPIR-V

History
- Predecessor: Radeon 500 series
- Variant: Radeon RX 5000 series

Support status
- GCN 4 cards supported

The AMD Radeon 600 series is a series of graphics processors developed by AMD. Its cards are desktop and mobile rebrands of previous generation Polaris cards, available only for OEMs. The series is targeting the entry-level segment and launched on August 13, 2019.

== Products ==
=== Desktop ===
- Supported display standards on desktop models are: DisplayPort 1.4a (HBR3), HDMI 2.0b, HDR10 color.
- Dual Link DVI also supported on Radeon RX 640.

Model (Code name)	Release date & Price	Architecture & fab	Transistors & die size	Core		Fillrate (Note: Boost values (if available) are stated below the base value in italic.) (Note: Texture fillrate is calculated as the number of Texture Mapping Units multiplied by the base (or boost) core clock speed.) (Note: Pixel fillrate is calculated as the number of Render Output Units multiplied by the base (or boost) core clock speed.)		Processing power (Note: Precision performance is calculated from the base (or boost) core clock speed based on a FMA operation.) (GFLOPS)		Memory				TBP	Bus interface
Model (Code name)	Release date & Price	Architecture & fab	Transistors & die size	Config (Note: Unified shaders : Texture mapping units : Render output units and Compute units (CU))	Clock (MHz)	Texture (GT/s)	Pixel (GP/s)	Single	Double	Size (GB)	Bandwidth (GB/s)	Bus type & width	Clock (MT/s)	TBP	Bus interface
Radeon 630 (Polaris 23)	Aug 13, 2019; OEM	GCN 4 GloFo 14 nm (Note: GlobalFoundries' 14 nm 14LPP FinFET process is second-sourced from Samsung Electronics.)	2.2×10^{9} 103 mm^{2}	512:32:8; 8 CU	1082; 1219	34.62; 38.98	8.65; 9.75	1,108; 1,248	69.24; 78.01	2; 4	48.0	GDDR5; 64-bit	6000	50 W	PCIe 3.0 ×8
Radeon RX 640 (Polaris 23)	Aug 13, 2019; OEM	GCN 4 GloFo 14 nm	2.2×10^{9} 103 mm^{2}	512:40:16; 8 CU	1082; 1287	43.28; 51.48	17.31; 20.59	1,385; 1,647	86.56; 102.9	2; 4	56.0	GDDR5; 64-bit	7000	50 W	PCIe 3.0 ×8
Radeon RX 640 (Polaris 23)	Aug 13, 2019; OEM	GCN 4 GloFo 14 nm	2.2×10^{9} 103 mm^{2}	640:40:16; 10 CU	1082; 1287	43.28; 51.48	17.31; 20.59	1,385; 1,647	86.56; 102.9	2; 4	56.0	GDDR5; 64-bit	7000	50 W	PCIe 3.0 ×8

=== Laptop ===
Model (Code name)	Release date & price	Architecture & fab	Transistors & die size	Core		Fillrate (Note: Boost values (if available) are stated below the base value in italic.) (Note: Texture fillrate is calculated as the number of Texture Mapping Units multiplied by the base (or boost) core clock speed.) (Note: Pixel fillrate is calculated as the number of Render Output Units multiplied by the base (or boost) core clock speed.)		Processing power (Note: Precision performance is calculated from the base (or boost) core clock speed based on a FMA operation.) (GFLOPS)		Memory				TBP	Bus interface
Model (Code name)	Release date & price	Architecture & fab	Transistors & die size	Config (Note: Unified shaders : Texture mapping units : Render output units and Compute units (CU))	Clock (MHz)	Texture (GT/s)	Pixel (GP/s)	Single	Double	Size (GB)	Bandwidth (GB/s)	Bus type & width	Clock (MT/s)	TBP	Bus interface
Radeon 610 (Banks)	Aug 13, 2019; OEM	GCN 1 TSMC 28 nm	6.9×10^{8} 56 mm^{2}	320:20:4; 5 CU	1030	20.60	8.24	659.2	41.20	2; 4	36.0	GDDR5; 64-bit	4500	50 W	PCIe 3.0 ×8
Radeon 620 (Polaris 24)	Aug 13, 2019; OEM	GCN 3 TSMC 28 nm	1.55×10^{9} 125 mm^{2}	320:20:8; 6 CU	730; 1024	17.52; 24.58	5.84; 8.19	560.6; 786.4	35.04; 49.15	2; 4	14.4	DDR3; 64-bit	1800	50 W	PCIe 3.0 ×8
Radeon 620 (Polaris 24)	Aug 13, 2019; OEM	GCN 3 TSMC 28 nm	1.55×10^{9} 125 mm^{2}	384:24:8; 6 CU	730; 1024	17.52; 24.58	5.84; 8.19	560.6; 786.4	35.04; 49.15	2; 4	36.0	GDDR5; 64-bit	4500	50 W	PCIe 3.0 ×8
Radeon 625 (Polaris 24)	Aug 13, 2019; OEM	GCN 3 TSMC 28 nm	1.55×10^{9} 125 mm^{2}	384:24:8; 6 CU	730; 1024	17.52; 24.58	5.84; 8.19	560.6; 786.4	35.04; 49.15	2; 4	36.0	GDDR5; 64-bit	4500	50 W	PCIe 3.0 ×8
Radeon 630 (Polaris 23)	Aug 13, 2019; OEM	GCN 4 GloFo 14 nm (Note: GlobalFoundries' 14 nm 14LPP FinFET process is second-sourced from Samsung Electronics.)	2.2×10^{9} 103 mm^{2}	512:32:8; 8 CU	1082; 1219	34.62; 38.98	8.65; 9.75	1,108; 1,248	69.24; 78.01	2; 4	48.0	GDDR5; 64-bit	6000	50 W	PCIe 3.0 ×8
Radeon RX 640 (Polaris 23)	Aug 13, 2019; OEM	GCN 4 GloFo 14 nm	2.2×10^{9} 103 mm^{2}	512:40:16; 8 CU	1082; 1287	43.28; 51.48	17.31; 20.59	1,385; 1,647	86.56; 102.9	2; 4	56.0	GDDR5; 64-bit	7000	50 W	PCIe 3.0 ×8
Radeon RX 640 (Polaris 23)	Aug 13, 2019; OEM	GCN 4 GloFo 14 nm	2.2×10^{9} 103 mm^{2}	640:40:16; 10 CU	1082; 1287	43.28; 51.48	17.31; 20.59	1,385; 1,647	86.56; 102.9	2; 4	56.0	GDDR5; 64-bit	7000	50 W	PCIe 3.0 ×8

== See also ==
- List of AMD graphics processing units
