= Air gap =

Air gap may refer to:

== Science and technology ==
- Air gap (plumbing), the vertical space between the water outlet and the flood level of a fixture
- Air gap (networking), physical isolation from external computer networks
- IBM airgap, a technique invented by IBM for fabricating vacuum pockets in integrated circuits
- Air gap (magnetic), a gap in the magnetic material
  - Air gap, used in inductors and transformers
  - Air gap in an electric machine, a space between the rotor and the stator in the machine
  - Air gap, the space between magnetic pole pieces in which a voice coil operates
- Air gaps, the use of air-filled or vacuum pockets as a replacement for low-κ dielectrics in integrated circuits

== Other uses ==
- Mid-Atlantic gap, a geographic area not covered by allied air support during the World War II Battle of the Atlantic

== See also ==
- Aire Gap, a geographical feature in the Pennines, England
