= RX 550 =

RX 550 may refer to:

- The Beaver RX 550, a model of the Spectrum Beaver ultralight aircraft
- The Radeon RX 550, a graphics card in the Radeon RX 500 series by AMD
