= IBM airgap =

Airgap is a technique invented by IBM for fabricating small pockets of vacuum in between copper interconnects. The technique belongs to a general class of similar techniques that replaces solid low-κ dielectrics with air-filled or vacuum pockets.

== Description ==
By insulating copper interconnects (wires) on an integrated circuit (IC) with vacuum holes, capacitance can be minimized enabling ICs to work faster or draw less power. A vacuum is believed to be the ultimate insulator for wiring capacitance, which occurs when two adjacent wires on an IC draw electrical energy from one another, generating undesirable heat and slowing the speed at which data can move through an IC. IBM estimates that this technology alone can lead to 35% higher speeds in current flow or 15% lower power consumption.

== Fabrication techniques ==
The technique fabricates air gaps on a large scale by exploiting the self-assembly properties of certain polymers. These polymers can be easily integrated into the process modules (a collection of related steps that fabricate a structure on an integrated circuit) used in conventional CMOS fabrication, avoiding the costs of heavily modifying the process technology (the collection of process modules that produces an integrated circuit).

The technique deposits a polymer material over the entire wafer, and removes it at a later stage. When the polymer is removed, it creates trillions of evenly spaced vacuum pockets that are 20 nanometers in diameter. IBM has demonstrated this technique in the laboratory, and has deployed it in its East Fishkill, New York fabrication plant, where prototype POWER6 processors using this technology have been fabricated. The technique was scheduled to be featured in production-ready process technology in 2009, as part of IBM's 45 nm node, after which it would also be available to IBM's clients.

== History ==
Airgap was developed in a collaborative effort between IBM's Almaden Research Center and T.J. Watson Research Center, and the University of Albany, New York.
