= Radeon 500 series =

Series of graphics cards by AMD

Radeon 500 Series
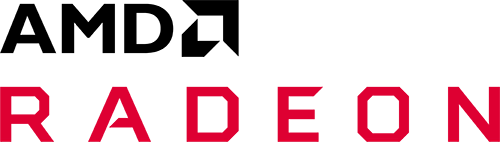
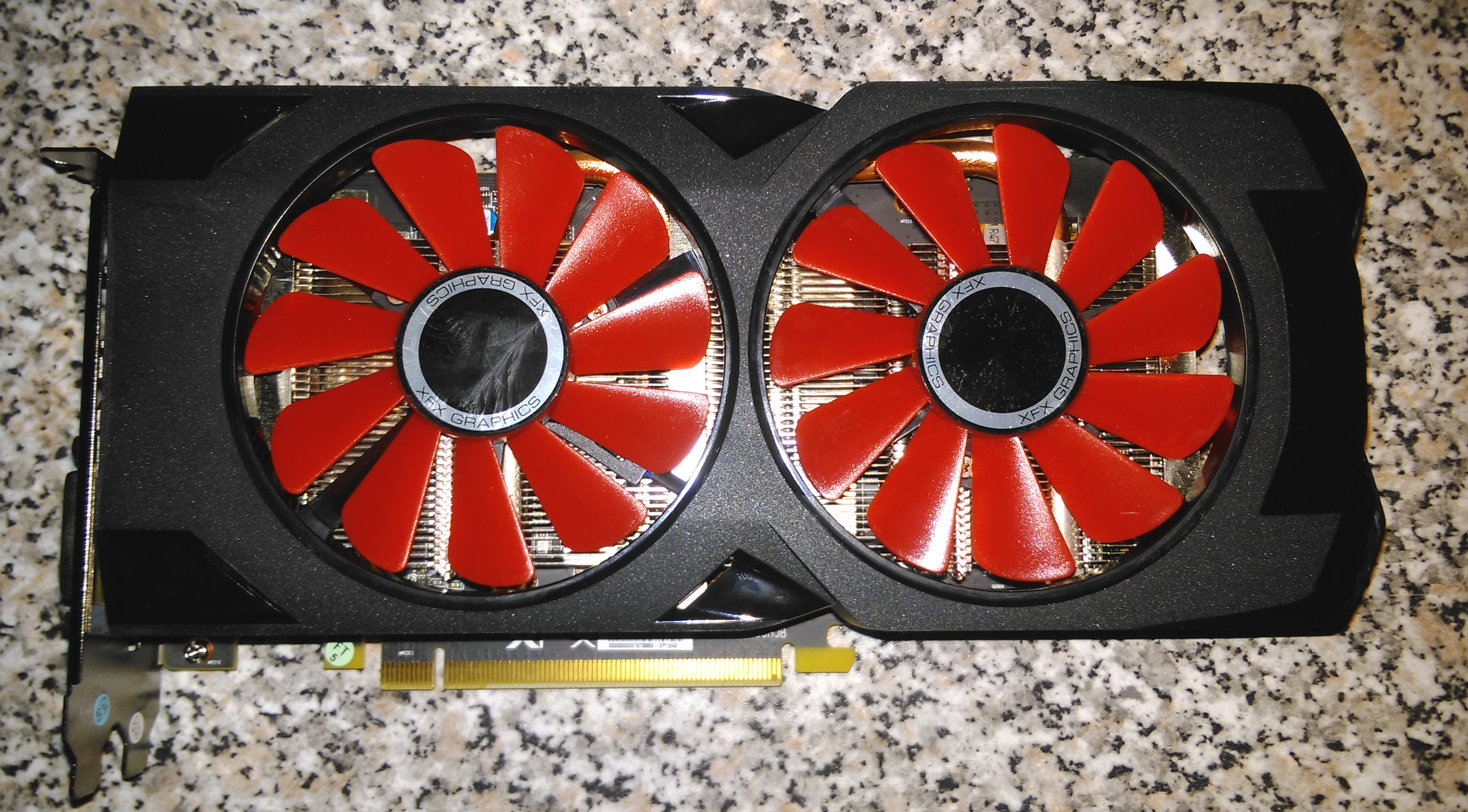
- An XFX Radeon RX 570 8GB
- Release date: April 18, 2017 (8 years ago)
- Codename: Polaris
- Architecture: GCN 1st gen GCN 3rd gen GCN 4th gen
- Transistors: 690M (Banks) 28 nm; 1.550M (Weston) 28 nm; 2.200M (Lexa) 14 nm; 3.000M (Baffin) 14 nm; 3.000M (Polaris 21) 14 nm; 5.700M (Polaris 20) 14 nm; 5.700M (Polaris 30) 12 nm
- Fabrication process: TSMC 28 nm (CMOS); Samsung/GloFo 14 nm (FinFET); Samsung/GloFo 12 nm (FinFET)

Cards
- Entry-level: Radeon 520; Radeon 530; Radeon 535; Radeon 540; Radeon 540X; Radeon 550X; Radeon RX 540; Radeon RX 540X
- Mid-range: Radeon RX 550; Radeon RX 550X; Radeon RX 560; Radeon RX 560X
- High-end: Radeon RX 570; Radeon RX 570X; Radeon RX 580; Radeon RX 580X
- Enthusiast: Radeon RX 590

API support
- Direct3D: Direct3D 12.0 (feature level 12_0); Shader Model 6.7 (GCN 4th gen) or Shader Model 6.5
- OpenCL: OpenCL 2.1
- OpenGL: OpenGL 4.6
- Vulkan: Vulkan 1.2 (GCN 1st gen and GCN 3rd gen for Windows); Vulkan 1.3 (GCN 4th gen for Windows, GCN 1st gen or newer for Linux); SPIR-V

History
- Predecessor: Radeon 400 series
- Successor: Radeon RX Vega series; Radeon 600 series (OEM)

Support status
- Supported, with less regular Windows driver update schedule

The Radeon 500 series is a series of graphics processors developed by AMD. These cards are based on the fourth iteration of the Graphics Core Next architecture, featuring GPUs based on Polaris 30, Polaris 20, Polaris 11, and Polaris 12 chips. Thus the RX 500 series uses the same microarchitecture and instruction set as its predecessor, while making use of improvements in the manufacturing process to enable higher clock rates.

Third-generation GCN chips are produced on a 28 nm CMOS process. Polaris (fourth-generation GCN) chips (except for Polaris 30) are produced on a 14 nm FinFET process, developed by Samsung Electronics and licensed to GlobalFoundries. Polaris 30 chips are produced on a 12 nm FinFET process, developed by Samsung and GlobalFoundries.

== Chipset table ==
=== Supported display standards ===
The series support DisplayPort 1.4 HBR, HDMI 2.0b, and HDR10 color. Dual-Link DVI-D and DVI-I at resolutions up to 4096×2304 and VGA at up to 2048x1536 are also supported, despite ports not being present on the reference cards, and cards with VGA ports are mostly sold in Eastern Asia exclusively.

=== List of graphics processors ===
Model (Code name)	Release Date & Price	Architecture & fab	Transistors & die size	Core		Fillrate (Note: Boost values (if available) are stated below the base value in italic.) (Note: Texture fillrate is calculated as the number of Texture Mapping Units multiplied by the base (or boost) core clock speed.) (Note: Pixel fillrate is calculated as the number of Render Output Units multiplied by the base (or boost) core clock speed.)		Processing power (Note: Precision performance is calculated from the base (or boost) core clock speed based on a FMA operation.) (GFLOPS)		Memory				TBP	Bus interface
Model (Code name)	Release Date & Price	Architecture & fab	Transistors & die size	Config (Note: Unified shaders : Texture mapping units : Render output units and Compute units (CU))	Clock (MHz)	Texture (GT/s)	Pixel (GP/s)	Single	Double	Size	Bus type & width	Clock (MT/s)	Bandwidth (GB/s)	TBP	Bus interface
Radeon 520 (Banks) (Note: Lacks hardware video encoder and decoder)	Apr 18, 2017; OEM	GCN 1; 28 nm	690×10^{6} 56mm^{2}	320:20:4; 5 CU	1030	20.6	4.1	659.2	41.2	1 GB; 2 GB	DDR3; GDDR5; 64-bit	2000; 4500	16; 36	?	PCIe 3.0 ×8
Radeon 530 (Weston)	Apr 18, 2017; OEM	GCN 3; 28 nm	? 125 mm^{2}	320:20:8; 5 CU	1024	20.480	8.2	655.36	40.96	1 GB; 2 GB; 4 GB	DDR3; GDDR5; 64-bit	1800; 4500	14.4; 36	?	PCIe 3.0 ×8
Radeon 530 (Weston)	Apr 18, 2017; OEM	GCN 3; 28 nm	? 125 mm^{2}	384:24:8; 6 CU	1024	24.576	8.2	786.432	49.152	1 GB; 2 GB; 4 GB	DDR3; GDDR5; 64-bit	1800; 4500	14.4; 36	?	PCIe 3.0 ×8
Radeon RX 540 (Polaris 12)	Apr 18, 2017; OEM	GCN 4 GloFo; 14LPP (Note: GlobalFoundries' 14 nm 14LPP FinFET process is second-sourced from Samsung Electronics.)	2.2×10^{9} 101 mm^{2}	512:32:16; 8 CU	1124; 1219	35.968; 39.008	17.984; 19.504	1150.976; 1248.256	71.936; 78.016	2 GB; 4 GB	GDDR5; 128-bit	6000	96	?	PCIe 3.0 ×8
Radeon RX 550 (Polaris 12)	Apr 20, 2017 $79 USD	GCN 4 GloFo; 14LPP	2.2×10^{9} 101 mm^{2}	512:32:16; 8 CU	1100; 1183	35.2; 37.856	17.6; 18.928	1126.4; 1211.392	70.4; 75.712	2 GB; 4 GB	GDDR5; 128-bit	7000	112	50 W	PCIe 3.0 ×8
Radeon RX 550 640SP (Polaris 11)	Apr 20, 2017 $79 USD	GCN 4 GloFo; 14LPP	3.0×10^{9} 123 mm^{2}	640:40:16; 10 CU	1019; 1071	40.76; 42.84	16.304; 17.136	1304.32; 1370.88	81.52; 85.68	2 GB; 4 GB	GDDR5; 128-bit	6000	96	60 W	PCIe 3.0 ×8
Radeon RX 550X (Polaris 12)	Apr 11, 2018 $79 USD	GCN 4 GloFo; 14LPP	2.2×10^{9} 101 mm^{2}	512:32:16; 8 CU	1100; 1287	35.2; 41.184	17.6; 20.592	1126.4; 1317.888	70.4; 82.368	2 GB; 4 GB	GDDR5; 128-bit	7000	112	50 W	PCIe 3.0 ×8
Radeon RX 550X 640SP (Polaris 11)	Apr 11, 2018; OEM	GCN 4 GloFo; 14LPP	3.0×10^{9} 123 mm^{2}	640:40:16; 10 CU	1019; 1071	40.76; 42.84	16.304; 17.136	1304.32; 1370.88	81.52; 85.68	2 GB; 4 GB	GDDR5; 128-bit	6000	96	60 W	PCIe 3.0 ×8
Radeon RX 560D (Polaris 21)	Jul 4, 2017; OEM and China Only	GCN 4 GloFo; 14LPP	3.0×10^{9} 123 mm^{2}	896:56:16; 14 CU	1090; 1175	61.0; 65.8	17,4; 18.8	1953; 2106	122,0; 131.6	2 GB; 4 GB	GDDR5; 128-bit	6000	96	65 W	PCIe 3.0 ×8
Radeon RX 560 (Note: In October 2017 AMD branded an additional Polaris chip as "RX 560", although it features fewer shader and texture mapping units than the first released RX 560.) (Polaris 21)	Jul 4, 2017 $99 USD	GCN 4 GloFo; 14LPP	3.0×10^{9} 123 mm^{2}	896:56:16; 14 CU	1090; 1175	61.0; 65.8	17.4; 18.8	1953; 2106	122.0; 131.6	2 GB; 4 GB	GDDR5; 128-bit	7000	112	60-80 W	PCIe 3.0 ×8
Radeon RX 560 (Polaris 21)	Apr 18, 2017 $99 USD	GCN 4 GloFo; 14LPP	3.0×10^{9} 123 mm^{2}	1024:64:16; 16 CU	1175; 1275	75.2; 81.6	18.8; 20.4	2406; 2611	150.4; 163.2	2 GB; 4 GB	GDDR5; 128-bit	7000	112	60-80 W	PCIe 3.0 ×8
Radeon RX 560 XT (Polaris 10/20)	Mar 13, 2019 China Only	GCN 4 GloFo; 14LPP	5.7×10^{9} 232 mm^{2}	1792:112:32 28 CU	973 1073	109.0 120.2	31.1 34.3	3487 3846	217.3 240.4	4 GB; 8 GB	GDDR5; 256-bit	6600	211	150 W	PCIe 3.0 ×16
Radeon RX 570 (Polaris 20)	Apr 18, 2017 $169 USD	GCN 4 GloFo; 14LPP	5.7×10^{9} 232 mm^{2}	2048:128:32; 32 CU	1168; 1244	149.5; 159.2	37.4; 39.8	4784; 5095	299.0; 318.4	4 GB; 8 GB	GDDR5; 256-bit	7000	224	150 W	PCIe 3.0 ×16
Radeon RX 580 2048SP (Polaris 20)	Oct 15, 2018; China Only	GCN 4 GloFo; 14LPP	5.7×10^{9} 232 mm^{2}	2048:128:32; 32 CU	1168; 1284	149.5; 159.2	37.4; 39.8	4784; 5095	299.0; 318.4	4 GB; 8 GB	GDDR5; 256-bit	7000	224	150 W	PCIe 3.0 ×16
Radeon RX 580 (Polaris 20)	Apr 18, 2017 $199 USD (4 GB) $229 USD (8 GB)	GCN 4 GloFo; 14LPP	5.7×10^{9} 232 mm^{2}	2304:144:32; 36 CU	1257; 1340	181.0; 193.0	40.2; 42.9	5792; 6175	362.0; 385.9	4 GB; 8 GB	GDDR5; 256-bit	8000	256	185 W	PCIe 3.0 ×16
Radeon RX 590 GME (Polaris 20)	March 9, 2020; China Only	GCN 4 GloFo; 14LPP	5.7×10^{9} 232 mm^{2}	2304:144:32; 36 CU	1257; 1380	181.0; 198.7	40.2; 44.2	5792; 6359	362.0; 397.4	8 GB	GDDR5; 256-bit	8000	256	175 W	PCIe 3.0 ×16
Radeon RX 590 (Polaris 30)	Nov 15, 2018 $279 USD	GCN 4 Samsung/GloFo; 12LP (14LP+) (Note: GlobalFoundries' 12 nm 12LP process is based on Samsung's 14 nm 14LPP process.)	5.7×10^{9} 232 mm^{2}	2304:144:32; 36 CU	1469; 1545	211.5; 222.5	47.0; 49.4	6769; 7120	423.0; 444.9	8 GB	GDDR5; 256-bit	8000	256	225 W	PCIe 3.0 ×16
Model (Code name)	Release Date & Price	Architecture & fab	Transistors & die size	Config	Clock (MHz)	Texture (GT/s)	Pixel (GP/s)	Single	Double	Size	Bus type & width	Clock (MT/s)	Bandwidth (GB/s)	TBP	Bus interface
Model (Code name)	Release Date & Price	Architecture & fab	Transistors & die size	Core		Fillrate		Processing power (GFLOPS)		Memory				TBP	Bus interface

== See also ==
- AMD Radeon Pro
- AMD FireStream
- List of AMD graphics processing units
