= Render output unit =

Hardware component of GPUs which calculates final pixel values

In computer graphics, the render output unit or raster operations pipeline (ROP) is a hardware component in modern graphics processing units (GPUs) and one of the final steps in the rendering process of modern graphics cards. The pixel pipelines take pixel (each pixel is a dimensionless point) and texel information and process it, via specific matrix and vector operations, into a final pixel or depth value; this process is called rasterization. Thus, ROPs control antialiasing, when more than one sample is merged into one pixel. The ROPs perform the transactions between the relevant buffers in the local memory – this includes writing or reading values, as well as blending them together. Dedicated antialiasing hardware used to perform hardware-based antialiasing methods like MSAA is contained in ROPs.

All data rendered has to travel through the ROP in order to be written to the framebuffer, from there it can be transmitted to the display.

Therefore, the ROP is where the GPU's output is assembled into a bitmapped image ready for display.

Historically the number of ROPs, texture mapping units (TMUs), and shader processing units/stream processors have been equal. However, from 2004, several GPUs have decoupled these areas to allow optimum transistor allocation for application workload and available memory performance. As the trend continues, it is expected that graphics processors will continue to decouple the various parts of their architectures to enhance their adaptability to future graphics applications. This design also allows chip makers to build a modular line-up, where the top-end GPUs are essentially using the same logic as the low-end products.

The terminology for ROPs can vary between manufacturers. For instance, while NVIDIA refers to them as ROPs, AMD uses the term "Render Backend" (RB).

== See also ==
- Graphics pipeline
- Rendering (computer graphics)
- Execution unit
- Bit blit
