= Radeon HD 3000 series =

Series of video cards

ATI Radeon HD 3000 series
- Release date: October 2007; 17 years ago
- Codename: Radeon R600 series
- Architecture: TeraScale 1
- Transistors: 181M 55nm (RV620): 378M 55nm (RV635); 666M 55nm (RV670); 666Mx2 55nm (R680)

Cards
- Entry-level: 3430, 3450, 3470
- Mid-range: 3650
- High-end: 3830, 3850, 3870
- Enthusiast: 3850X2, 3870X2

API support
- OpenCL: Close To Metal
- OpenGL: OpenGL 3.3

History
- Predecessor: Radeon HD 2000 series
- Successor: Radeon HD 4000 series

Support status
- Unsupported

The graphics processing unit (GPU) codenamed the Radeon R600 is the foundation of the Radeon HD 2000/3000 series and the FireGL 2007 series video cards developed by ATI Technologies.

== Architecture ==
This article is about all products under the brand "Radeon HD 3000 Series". All products of this series contain a GPU which implements TeraScale 1.

=== Video acceleration ===
The Unified Video Decoder (UVD) SIP core is present on the dies of the GPUs used in the HD 2400 and the HD 2600 but not of the HD 2900. The HD 2900 introduced the ability to decode video within the 3D engine. This approach also exonerates the CPU from doing these computations, but consumes considerably more electric current.

== Desktop products ==
=== Radeon HD 3800 ===
The Radeon HD 3800 series was based on the codenamed RV670 GPU, packed 666 million transistors on a 55 nm fabrication process and had a die size at 192 mm^{2}, with the same 64 shader clusters as the R600 core, but the memory bus width was reduced to 256 bits.

The RV670 GPU is also the base of the FireStream 9170 stream processor, which uses the GPU to perform general purpose floating-point calculations which were done in the CPU previously.

The Radeon HD 3850 and 3870 became available mid-November 2007.

==== Radeon HD 3690/3830 ====
The Radeon HD 3690, which was limited only to the Chinese market where it was named HD 3830, has the same core as the Radeon 3800 series but with only a 128-bit memory controller and 256 MiB of GDDR3 memory. All other hardware specifications are retained.

A further announcement was made that there would be a Radeon HD 3830 variant bearing the same features as Radeon HD 3690, but with a unique device ID that does not allow add-in card partners in China to re-enable the burnt-out portion of the GPU core for more memory bandwidth.

The Radeon HD 3690 was released early February 2008 for the Chinese market only.

==== Radeon HD 3870 X2 ====
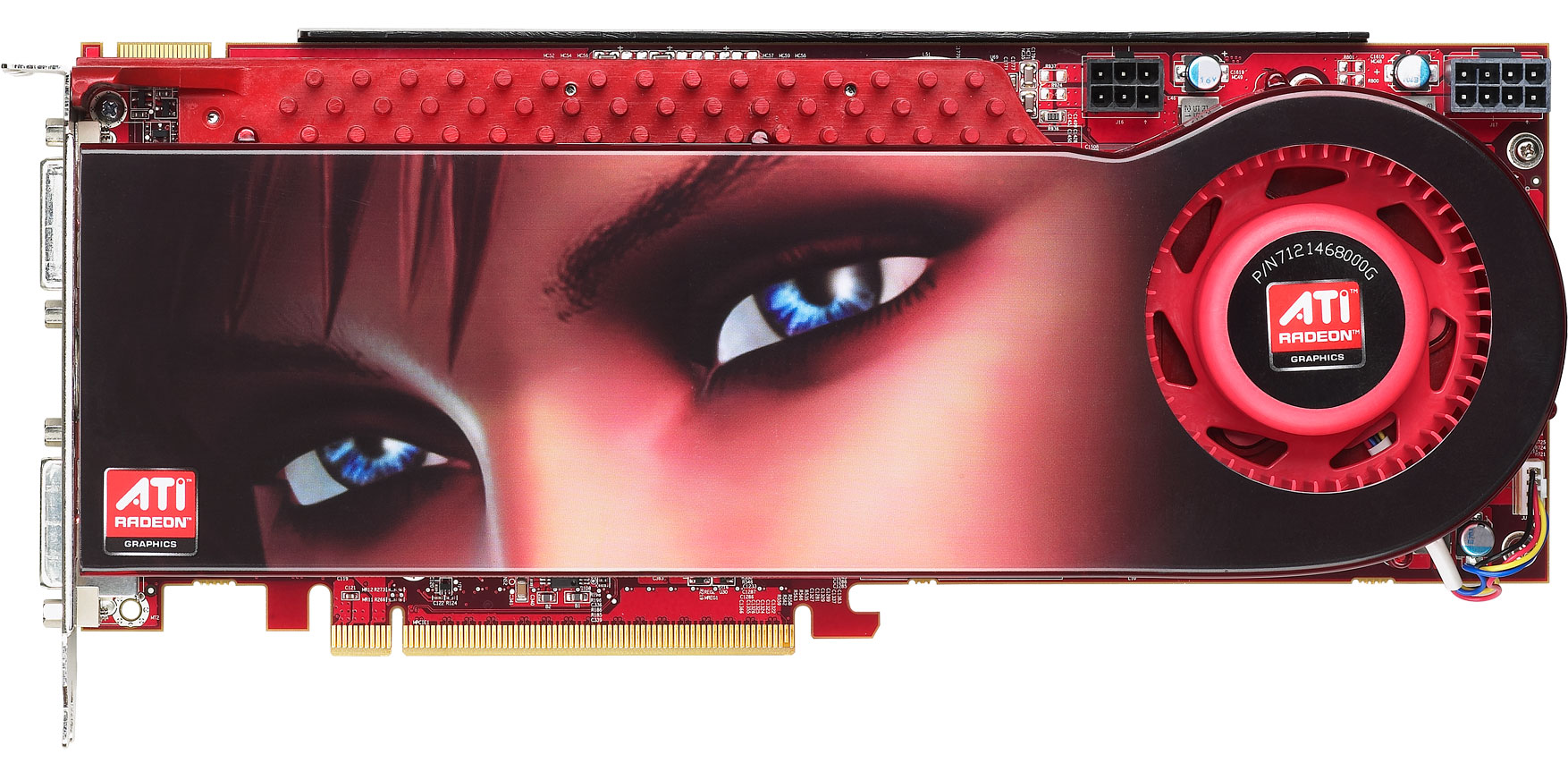
Reference model provided by AMD / ATI

Radeon HD 3870 X2 (codenamed R680) was released on January 28, 2008, featuring 2 RV670 cores with a maximum of 1 GiB GDDR3 SDRAM, targeting the enthusiast market and replacing the Radeon HD 2900 XT. The processor achieved a peak single-precision floating point performance of 1.06 TFLOPS, being the world's first single-PCB graphics product breaking the 1 TFLOP mark.

Technically, this Radeon HD 3870 X2 can really be understood as a CrossFire of two HD 3870 on a single PCB. The card only integrates a PCI Express 1.1 bridge to connect the two GPUs. They communicate via a bidirectional bus that has 16 lines for a bandwidth of 2 x 4 Gbit/s. This has no negative effect on performance.

Starting with the Catalyst 8.3 drivers, Amd/Ati officially supports CrossFireX technology for the 3800 series, which means that up to four GPUs can be used in a pair of Radeon HD 3870 X2.

AMD stated the possibility of supporting 4 Radeon HD 3870 X2 cards, allowing 8 GPUs to be used on several motherboards, including the MSI K9A2 Platinum and Intel D5400XS, because these motherboards have sufficient spaces between PCI-E slots for dual-slot cooler video cards, presumably as a combination of two separate hardware CrossFire setups with a software CrossFire setup bridging the two, but currently with no driver support.

=== Radeon HD 3600 ===
The Radeon HD 3600 series was based on the codenamed RV635 GPU, packed 378 million transistors on 55 nm fabrication process, and had 128-bit memory bus width. The support for HDMI and D-sub ports is also achieved through separate dongles. Beside the DisplayPort implementations, there also exists other display output layouts as dual DVI port or DVI with D-sub display output layout.

The only variant, the Radeon HD 3650, was released on January 23, 2008, and has also an AGP slot with 64-bit bus width or the standard PCI-E slot with 128-bit.

=== Radeon HD 3400 ===
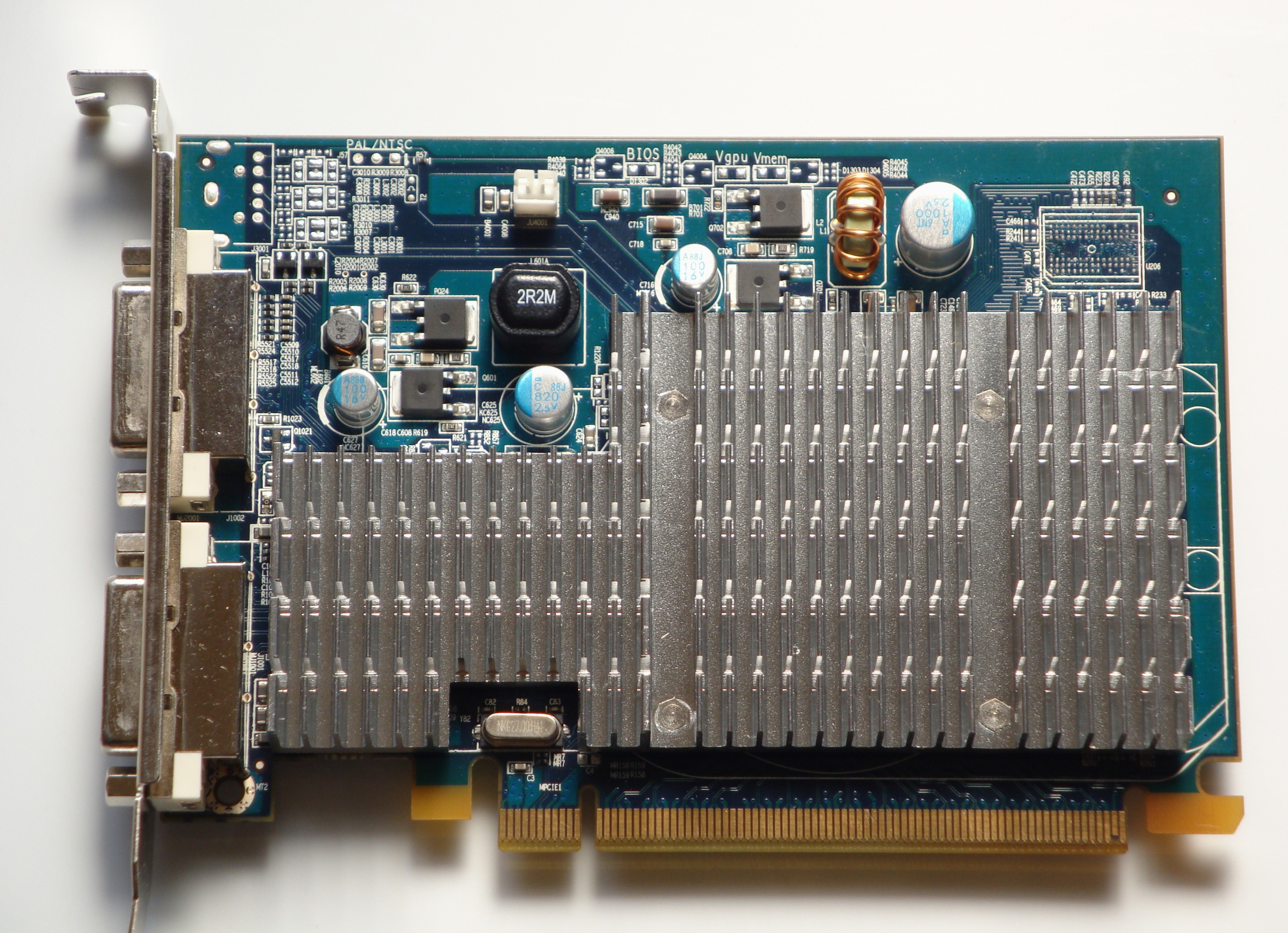
AMD Radeon HD3450

The Radeon HD 3400 series was based on the codenamed RV620 GPU, packed 181 million transistors on a 55 nm fabrication process, and had 64-bit memory bus width. Products were available both as full height cards and as low-profile cards.

One of the notable features is that the Radeon HD 3400 series (including Mobility Radeon HD 3400 series) video cards support ATI Hybrid Graphics.

The Radeon HD 3450 and Radeon HD 3470 were released on January 23, 2008.

== Mobile products ==
All Mobility Radeon HD 2000/3000 series share the same feature set support as their desktop counterparts, as well as the addition of the battery-conserving PowerPlay 7.0 features, which are augmented from the previous generation's PowerPlay 6.0.

The Mobility Radeon HD 2300 is a budget product which includes UVD in silica but lacks unified shader architecture and DirectX 10.0/SM 4.0 support, limiting support to DirectX 9.0c/SM 3.0 using the more traditional architecture of the previous generation. A high-end variant, the Mobility Radeon HD 2700, with higher core and memory frequencies than the Mobility Radeon HD 2600, was released in mid-December 2007.

The Mobility Radeon HD 2400 is offered in two model variants; the standard HD 2400 and the HD 2400 XT.

The Mobility Radeon HD 2600 is also available in the same two flavors; the plain HD 2600 and, at the top of the mobility lineup, the HD 2600 XT.

The half-generation update treatment had also applied to mobile products. Announced prior to CES 2008 was the Mobility Radeon HD 3000 series. Released in the first quarter of 2008, the Mobility Radeon HD 3000 series consisted of two families, the Mobility Radeon HD 3400 series and the Mobility Radeon HD 3600 series. The Mobility Radeon HD 3600 series also featured the industry's first implementation of on-board 128-bit GDDR4 memory.

About the time of late March to early April, 2008, AMD renewed the device ID list on its website with the inclusion of Mobility Radeon HD 3850 X2 and Mobility Radeon HD 3870 X2 and their respective device IDs. Later in Spring IDF 2008 held in Shanghai, a development board of the Mobility Radeon HD 3870 X2 was demonstrated alongside a Centrino 2 platform demonstration system. The Mobility Radeon HD 3870 X2 was based on two M88 GPUs with the addition of a PCI Express switch chip on a single PCB. The demonstrated development board is on PCI Express 2.0 ×16 bus, while the final product is expected to be on AXIOM/MXM modules.

== Chipset table ==
=== Desktop GPUs ===
Model	Launch	Code name	Fab (nm)	Transistors (million)	Die size (mm^{2})	Bus interface	Clock rate		Core config	Fillrate		Memory				Processing power (GFLOPS)		TDP (Watts)	Crossfire Support	API support (version)			Release price (USD)
Model	Launch	Code name	Fab (nm)	Transistors (million)	Die size (mm^{2})	Bus interface	Core (MHz)	Memory (MHz)	Core config	Pixel (GP/s)	Texture (GT/s)	Size (MB)	Bandwidth (GB/s)	Bus type	Bus width (Bit)	Single precision	Double precision	Max.	Crossfire Support	Direct3D	OpenGL	OpenCL, ATI Stream	Release price (USD)
Radeon HD 3410	May 7, 2009	RV610	65	180	85	PCIe 1.0 ×16	519	396	40:4:4	2.08	2.08	256	6.34	DDR2	64	41.52	—	20	No	10.0	3.3	No, Yes	?
Radeon HD 3450	January 23, 2008	RV620 LE	55	181	67	PCIe 2.0 ×16; PCI; AGP 8×	600	500	40:4:4	2.40	2.40	256; 512	8.00	DDR2	64	48.0	—	25	No	10.1	3.3	No, Yes	?
Radeon HD 3470	January 23, 2008	RV620 PRO	55	181	67	PCIe 2.0 ×16	800	950	40:4:4	3.20	3.20	256; 512	15.2	DDR2; GDDR3	64	64.0	—	30	No	10.1	3.3	No, Yes	?
Radeon HD 3550	August 4, 2008	RV620 PRO	55	181	67	PCIe 2.0 ×16	594	396	40:4:4	2.38	2.38	512	6.34	DDR2	64	47.52	—	30	No	10.1	3.3	No, Yes	?
Radeon HD 3570	July 5, 2010	RV620 PRO	55	181	67	PCIe 2.0 ×16	796	495	40:4:4	3.18	3.18	512	7.92	DDR2	64	63.68	—	30	No	10.1	3.3	No, Yes	?
Radeon HD 3610	September 24, 2009	RV630 PRO	65	390	153	PCIe 1.0 ×16	594	396	120:8:4	2.38	4.75	512; 1024	12.7	DDR2	128	142.6	—	35	No	10.1	3.3	No, Yes	?
Radeon HD 3650	January 23, 2008	RV635 PRO	55	378	153	PCIe 2.0 ×16; AGP 8×	725	405; 800	120:8:4	2.90	5.80	256; 512; 1024	13.0; 25.6	DDR2; GDDR3; GDDR4	128	174.0	—	65	2-way CrossFire	10.1	3.3	No, Yes	?
Radeon HD 3730	October 5, 2008	RV635 PRO	55	378	135	PCIe 2.0 ×16	722	405	120:8:4	2.89	5.78	512; 1024	13.0	DDR2	128	173.3	—	65	No	10.1	3.3	No, Yes	?
Radeon HD 3750	October 5, 2008	RV635 PRO	55	378	135	PCIe 2.0 ×16	796	693	120:8:4	3.18	6.37	512	22.2	GDDR3	128	191.0	—	65	2-way CrossFire	10.1	3.3	No, Yes	?
Radeon HD 3830	April 1, 2008	RV670 PRO	55	666	192	PCIe 2.0 ×16	668	828	320:16:16	10.7	10.7	256	26.5	GDDR3	128	427.5	85.4	75	2-way CrossFire	10.1	3.3	No, Yes	$129
Radeon HD 3850	November 19, 2007	RV670 PRO	55	666	192	PCIe 2.0 x16 AGP 8x	668	830; 900	320:16:16	10.7	10.7	256; 512; 1024	53.1; 57.6	GDDR3; GDDR4	256	427.5	85.4	75	4-way CrossFire	10.1	3.3	No, Yes	$179
Radeon HD 3870	November 19, 2007	RV670 XT	55	666	192	PCIe 2.0 x16 AGP 8x	777	900; 1126	320:16:16	12.4	12.4	512; 1024	57.6; 72.1	GDDR3; GDDR4	256	497.3	99.2	106	4-way CrossFire	10.1	3.3	No, Yes	$219
Radeon HD 3850 X2	April 4, 2008	RV670 PRO	55	666×2	192×2	PCIe 2.0 ×16	668	828	320:16:16×2	10.7×2	10.7×2	512×2	53.0×2	GDDR3	256×2	428.2×2	85.6×2	140	2-way CrossFire	10.1	3.3	No, Yes	$349
Radeon HD 3870 X2	January 28, 2008	R680	55	666×2	192×2	PCIe 2.0 ×16	825	901; 1125	320:16:16×2	13.2×2	13.2×2	512×2	57.6×2; 72.1×2	GDDR3; GDDR4	256×2	528.0×2	105.6×2	165	2-way CrossFire	10.1	3.3	No, Yes	$449

==== IGP (HD 3000) ====
- All Radeon HD 3000 IGP models include Direct3D 10.0 and OpenGL 3.3

Model	Launch	Code name	Graphics core	Fab (nm)	Transistors (million)	Die size (mm^{2})	Bus interface	Core clock^{2} (MHz)	Core config^{1}	Fillrate			Memory^{3}					Processing power (GFLOPS)	Features / Notes
Model	Launch	Code name	Graphics core	Fab (nm)	Transistors (million)	Die size (mm^{2})	Bus interface	Core clock^{2} (MHz)	Core config^{1}	Pixel (GP/s)	Texture (GT/s)	FP32 (GP/s)	Size (MB)	Bandwidth (GB/s)	Bus type	Effective clock (MHz)	Bus width (Bit)	Processing power (GFLOPS)	Features / Notes
Radeon 3000 Graphics (760G Chipset)	2009	RS780L	RV610	55	205	~73 (~9 × 8.05)	HT 3.0	350	40:4:4	1.4	1.4	0.7	Up to 512 system	20.8 (system)	HT (system)	—	—	28	AVIVO
Radeon 3100 Graphics (780V Chipset)	2008; Jan 23 (China); Mar 4 (worldwide)	RS780C	RV610	55	205	~73 (~9 × 8.05)	HT 3.0	350	40:4:4	1.4	1.4	0.7	Up to 512 system	20.8 (system)	HT (system)	—	—	28	AVIVO
Radeon HD 3200 Graphics (780G Chipset)	2008; Jan 23 (China); Mar 4 (worldwide)	RS780	RV610	55	205	~73 (~9 × 8.05)	HT 3.0	500	40:4:4	2	2	1	Up to 512 system + optional 128 sideport	20.8 (system) + 2.6 (sideport)	HT (system) + DDR2-1066 DDR3-1333 (sideport)	1333 (sideport)	16 (sideport)	40	UVD+, 8× AA (wide-tent CFAA)
Radeon HD 3300 Graphics (790GX Chipset)	Jul 2008	RS780D	RV610	55	205	~73 (~9 × 8.05)	HT 3.0	700	40:4:4	2.8	2.8	1.4	Up to 512 system + 128 sideport	20.8 (system) + 2.6 (sideport)	HT (system) + DDR3-1333 (sideport)	1333 (sideport)	16 (sideport)	56	UVD+, PowerPlay

^{1} Unified shaders : Texture mapping units : Render output units
^{2} The clock frequencies may vary in different usage scenarios, as AMD PowerPlay technology is implemented. The clock frequencies listed here refer to the officially announced clock specifications.
^{3} The sideport is a dedicated memory bus. It is preferably used for a frame buffer.

=== Mobility Radeon ===
Model	Launch	Model number	Code name	Fab (nm)	Bus interface	Core clock (MHz)	Memory clock (MHz)	Core config^{1}	Fillrate		Memory				API compliance (version)		Processing power (GFLOPS)	TDP (Watts)	Notes
Model	Launch	Model number	Code name	Fab (nm)	Bus interface	Core clock (MHz)	Memory clock (MHz)	Core config^{1}	Pixel (GP/s)	Texture (GT/s)	Size (MB)	Bandwidth (GB/s)	Bus type	Bus width (bit)	Direct3D	OpenGL	Processing power (GFLOPS)	TDP (Watts)	Notes
Mobility Radeon HD 3100	August 1, 2008	RS780MC	RV620	55	PCIe ×16 1.1	300	800 (system memory)	40:4:4	1.2	1.2	up to 512 from system memory	6.4/12.8	DDR2	64/128	10.1	2.0 (3.3)	24		UVD, PowerPlay 7.0
Mobility Radeon HD 3200	June 4, 2008	RS780MC	RV620	55	PCIe ×16 1.1	500	800 (system memory)	40:4:4	2	2	up to 512 from system memory	6.4/12.8	DDR2	64/128	10.1	2.0 (3.3)	40		UVD, PowerPlay 7.0
Mobility Radeon HD 3410	July 25, 2008	M82-MPE	RV620	55	PCIe ×16 1.1	400	400	40:4:4	1.6	1.6	256, 512	6.4	DDR2	64	10.1	2.0 (3.3)	32		UVD, PowerPlay 7.0
Mobility Radeon HD 3430	July 25, 2008	M82-SE	RV620	55	PCIe ×16 2.0	450	400	40:4:4	1.8	1.8	256	6.4	DDR2	64	10.1	2.0 (3.3)	36		UVD, PowerPlay 7.0
Mobility Radeon HD 3450	January 7, 2008	M82	RV620	55	PCIe ×16 2.0	500	400; 700	40:4:4	2	2	256	6.4; 11.2	DDR2; GDDR3	64	10.1	2.0 (3.3)	40		UVD, PowerPlay 7.0
Mobility Radeon HD 3470	January 7, 2008	M82-XT	RV620	55	PCIe ×16 2.0	680	400; 800	40:4:4	2.72	2.72	256	6.4; 12.8	DDR2; GDDR3	64	10.1	2.0 (3.3)	54.4		UVD, PowerPlay 7.0
Mobility Radeon HD 3650	January 7, 2008	M86	RV635	55	PCIe ×16 2.0	500	500; 700	120:8:4	2	4	512; 1024	16.0; 22.4	DDR2; GDDR3; GDDR4	128	10.1	3.3	120		UVD, PowerPlay 7.0
Mobility Radeon HD 3670	January 7, 2008	M86-XT	RV635	55	PCIe ×16 2.0	680	800	120:8:4	2.72	5.44	512; 1024	25.6	DDR2; GDDR3; GDDR4	128	10.1	2.0 (3.3)	163.2	30	UVD, PowerPlay 7.0
Mobility Radeon HD 3850	June 4, 2008	M88-L/M88-LP	RV670	55	PCIe ×16 2.0	580	750	320:16:16	9.28	9.28	512	48.0	GDDR3	256	10.1	2.0 (3.3)	371.2		UVD, PowerPlay 7.0
Mobility Radeon HD 3870	June 4, 2008	M88-LXT	RV670	55	PCIe ×16 2.0	660	850	320:16:16	10.56	10.56	512	54.4	GDDR3	256	10.1	2.0 (3.3)	422.4	55	UVD, PowerPlay 7.0
Mobility Radeon HD 3850 X2	June 5, 2008	2× M88-L/M88-LP	R680	55	PCIe ×16 2.0	580	750	2x [320:16:16]	2× 9.28	2× 9.28	2× 512	2× 48.0	GDDR3	2× 256	10.1	2.0 (3.3)	2× 371.2		UVD, PowerPlay 7.0
Mobility Radeon HD 3870 X2	September 1, 2008	2× M88-LXT	R680	55	PCIe ×16 2.0	660	850	2x [320:16:16]	2× 10.56	2× 10.56	2× 512	2× 54.4	GDDR3	2× 256	10.1	2.0 (3.3)	2× 422.4	110	UVD, PowerPlay 7.0

^{1} Unified Shaders : Texture mapping units : Render output units

== Radeon Feature Matrix ==
The following table shows features of AMD/ATI's GPUs (see also: List of AMD graphics processing units).

Name of GPU series	Wonder	Mach	3D Rage	Rage Pro	Rage 128	R100	R200	R300	R400	R500	R600	RV670	R700	Evergreen	Northern Islands		Southern Islands	Sea Islands	Volcanic Islands	Arctic Islands/Polaris	Vega	Navi 1x	Navi 2x	Navi 3x	Navi 4x
Released	1986	1991	Apr; 1996	Mar; 1997	Aug; 1998	Apr; 2000	Aug; 2001	Sep; 2002	May; 2004	Oct; 2005	May; 2007	Nov; 2007	Jun; 2008	Sep; 2009	Oct; 2010	Dec; 2010	Jan; 2012	Sep; 2013	Jun; 2015	Jun 2016, Apr 2017, Aug 2019	Jun 2017, Feb 2019	Jul; 2019	Nov; 2020	Dec; 2022	Feb; 2025
Marketing Name	Wonder	Mach	3D; Rage	Rage; Pro	Rage; 128	Radeon; 7000	Radeon; 8000	Radeon; 9000	Radeon; X700/X800	Radeon; X1000	Radeon; HD 2000	Radeon; HD 3000	Radeon; HD 4000	Radeon; HD 5000	Radeon; HD 6000		Radeon; HD 7000	Radeon; 200	Radeon; 300	Radeon; 400/500/600	Radeon; RX Vega, Radeon VII	Radeon; RX 5000	Radeon; RX 6000	Radeon; RX 7000	Radeon; RX 9000
AMD support	Ended																			Current					
Kind	2D		3D																						
Instruction set architecture	Not publicly known										TeraScale instruction set						GCN instruction set					RDNA instruction set			
Microarchitecture	Not publicly known					GFX1		GFX2			TeraScale 1 (VLIW5) (GFX3)			TeraScale 2 (VLIW5) (GFX4)	TeraScale 2 (VLIW5) up to 68xx (GFX4)	TeraScale 3 (VLIW4) in 69xx (GFX5)	GCN 1st gen (GFX6)	GCN 2nd gen (GFX7)	GCN 3rd gen (GFX8)	GCN 4th gen (GFX8)	GCN 5th gen (GFX9)	RDNA (GFX10.1)	RDNA 2 (GFX10.3)	RDNA 3 (GFX11)	RDNA 4 (GFX12)
Type	Fixed pipeline (Note: The Radeon 100 Series has programmable pixel shaders, but do not fully comply with DirectX 8 or Pixel Shader 1.0. See article on R100's pixel shaders.)						Programmable pixel & vertex pipelines				Unified shader model														
Direct3D	—		5.0	6.0		7.0	8.1	9.0; 11 (9_2)	9.0b 11 (9_2)	9.0c 11 (9_3)	10.0; 11 (10_0)	10.1; 11 (10_1)		11 (11_0)			11 (11_1); 12 (11_1)	11 (12_0); 12 (12_0)			11 (12_1); 12 (12_1)		11 (12_1); 12 (12_2)		
Shader model	—						1.4	2.0+	2.0b	3.0	4.0	4.1		5.0			5.1	5.1; 6.5			6.7				6.8
OpenGL	—			1.1	1.2	1.3		2.1 (Note: R300, R400 and R500 based cards do not fully comply with OpenGL 2+ as the hardware does not support all types of non-power of two (NPOT) textures.)			3.3			4.5 (Note: OpenGL 4+ compliance requires supporting FP64 shaders and these are emulated on some TeraScale chips using 32-bit hardware.)			4.6								
Vulkan	—															1.1 (Note: Vulkan support is theoretically possible but has not been implemented in a stable driver.)	1.3		1.4						
OpenCL	—										Close to Metal		1.1 (not supported by Mesa)	1.2+ (on Linux: 1.1+ (no Image support on Clover, with by Rusticl) with Mesa, 1.2+ on GCN 1.Gen)				2.0+ (Adrenalin driver on Win7+) (on Linux ROCm, Mesa 1.2+ (no Image support in Clover, but in Rusticl with Mesa, 2.0+ and 3.0 with AMD drivers or AMD ROCm), 5th gen: 2.2 win 10+ and Linux RocM 5.0+				2.2+ and 3.0 Windows 8.1+ and Linux ROCm 5.0+ (Mesa Rusticl 1.2+ and 3.0 (2.1+ and 2.2+ wip))			
HSA / ROCm	—																Yes					?			
Video decoding ASIC	—										Avivo/UVD	UVD+	UVD 2	UVD 2.2	UVD 3		UVD 4	UVD 4.2	UVD 5.0 or 6.0	UVD 6.3	UVD 7 (Note: The UVD and VCE were replaced by the Video Core Next (VCN) ASIC in the Raven Ridge APU implementation of Vega.)	VCN 2.0	VCN 3.0	VCN 4.0	VCN 5.0
Video encoding ASIC	—																VCE 1.0	VCE 2.0	VCE 3.0 or 3.1	VCE 3.4	VCE 4.0	VCN 2.0	VCN 3.0	VCN 4.0	VCN 5.0
Fluid Motion (Note: Video processing for video frame rate interpolation technique. In Windows it works as a DirectShow filter in your player. In Linux, there is no support on the part of drivers and / or community.)	No																	Yes				No		?	
Power saving	?										PowerPlay				PowerTune		PowerTune & ZeroCore Power					?			
TrueAudio	—																	Via dedicated DSP		Via shaders					
FreeSync	—																	1; 2							
HDCP (Note: To play protected video content, it also requires card, operating system, driver, and application support. A compatible HDCP display is also needed for this. HDCP is mandatory for the output of certain audio formats, placing additional constraints on the multimedia setup.)	—										?							1.4		2.2		2.3			
PlayReady	—																			3.0	No	3.0			
Supported displays (Note: More displays may be supported with native DisplayPort connections, or splitting the maximum resolution between multiple monitors with active converters.)						1–2	2							2–6								?			4
Max. resolution	?													2–6 × 2560×1600			2–6 × 4096×2160 @ 30 Hz			2–6 × 5120×2880 @ 60 Hz	3 × 7680×4320 @ 60 Hz	7680×4320 @ 60 Hz PowerColor		7680x4320 @165 Hz	7680x4320
/drm/radeon (Note: DRM (Direct Rendering Manager) is a component of the Linux kernel. AMDgpu is the Linux kernel module. Support in this table refers to the most current version.)						Yes													—						
/drm/amdgpu	—																	Optional	Yes						

== Graphics device drivers ==
=== AMD's proprietary graphics device driver "Catalyst" ===
AMD Catalyst is being developed for Microsoft Windows and Linux. As of July 2014, other operating systems are not officially supported. This may be different for the AMD FirePro brand, which is based on identical hardware but features OpenGL-certified graphics device drivers.

AMD Catalyst supports of course all features advertised for the Radeon brand.

The Radeon HD 3000 series has been transitioned to legacy support, where drivers will be updated only to fix bugs instead of being optimized for new applications.

=== Free and open-source graphics device driver "Radeon" ===
The free and open-source drivers are primarily developed on Linux and for Linux, but have been ported to other operating systems as well. Each driver is composed out of five parts:

1. Linux kernel component DRM
2. Linux kernel component KMS driver: basically the device driver for the display controller
3. user-space component libDRM
4. user-space component in Mesa 3D;
5. a special and distinct 2D graphics device driver for X.Org Server, which is finally about to be replaced by Glamor

The free and open-source "Radeon" graphics driver supports most of the features implemented into the Radeon line of GPUs. They are not reverse engineered, but based on documentation released by AMD.

== See also ==
- AMD FirePro
- FireStream 9170, the GPGPU version of Radeon HD 3870 graphics card
- List of AMD graphics processing units
