= FT3 =

FT3 or ft3 may refer to:

- Cubic foot (ft^{3})
- Finlayson Lake Airport
- Free Triiodothyronine
- Socket FT3
