= AMD Software =

Device driver and utility software package for AMD GPUs and APUs

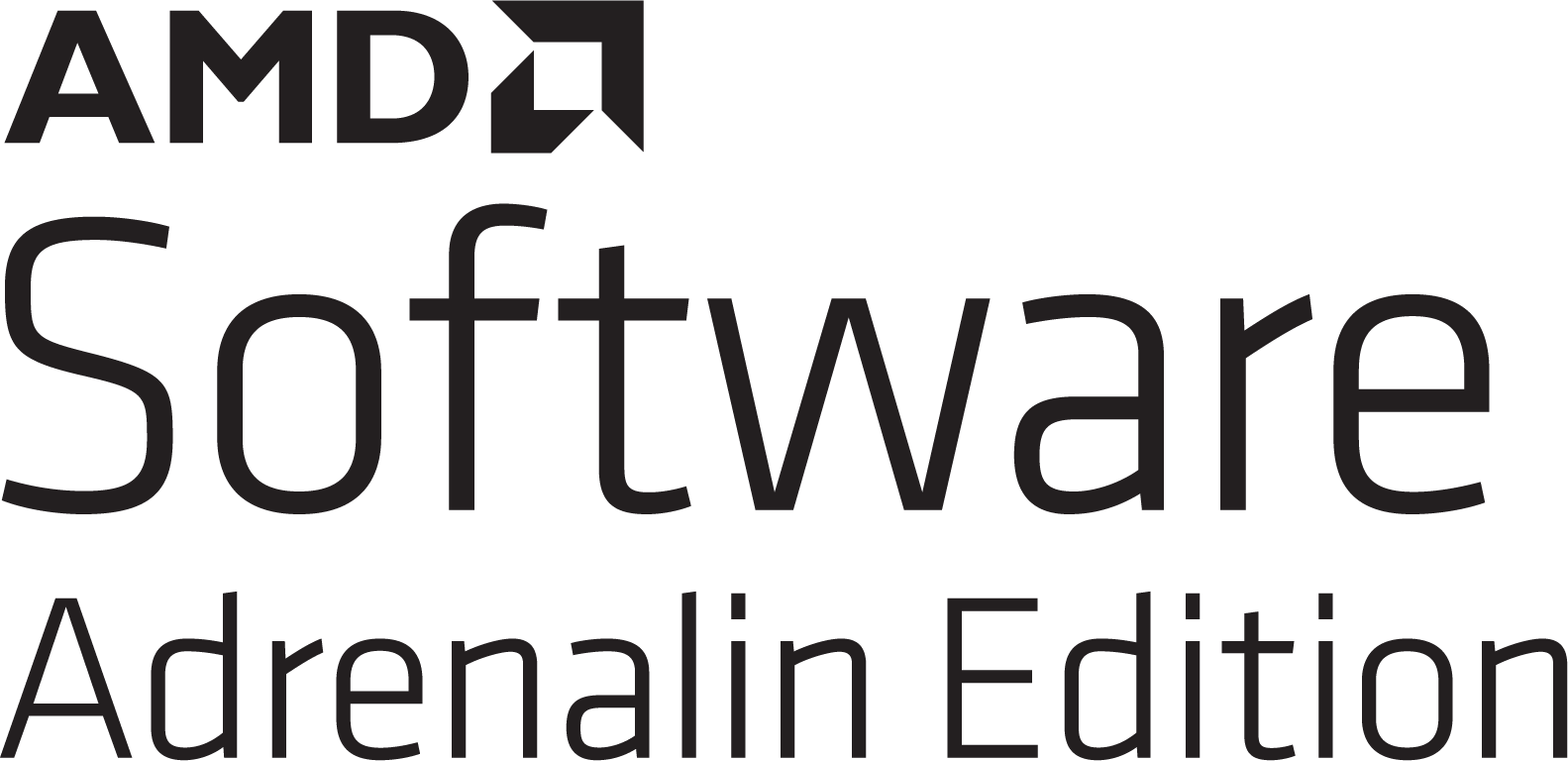
- Original author: ATI Technologies
- Developer: AMD
- Release: 02.1 / June 13, 2002 (24 years ago)
- Stable release: Windows: Recommended (Note: Recommended releases are releases that have passed both WHQL tests and certification, as well as AMD's own suite of tests, and are guaranteed to be highly stable by AMD.) 25.11.1 / November 13, 2025 (10 months ago); Optional (Note: Optional releases are releases that have only passed WHQL tests, and may or may not have the WHQL certification. These driver releases are more geared towards supporting new game and hardware releases from their launch.) 26.2.1 / February 11, 2026 (7 months ago); Unified-Linux; 25.35.1 / March 23, 2026 (6 months ago)
- Operating system: Microsoft Windows; Linux
- Platform: x64
- Type: Device driver and management
- License: Freeware
- Website: www.amd.com/en/products/software/adrenalin.html

AMD Software (formerly known as Radeon Software) is a device driver and utility software package for AMD's Radeon graphics cards and APUs. Its graphical user interface is built with Qt and is compatible with 64-bit Windows and Linux distributions.

== Software bundle ==
=== Functionality ===
AMD Software includes the following feature set:

- Game profile management
- Overclocking and undervolting
- Performance monitoring
- Recording and streaming
- Captured video and screenshot management
- Software update notifications
- Upgrade advisor

Radeon Anti-Lag reduces input latency. It helps when the GPU is bottlenecking the CPU and is supported in DirectX 9, 11, and 12. Radeon Super Resolution is image upscaling technology similar to FidelityFX Super Resolution (FSR), but it does not have to be customized for specific games. It works on thousands of games, but AMD recommends using FSR when available. Radeon Boost also uses image upscaling to increase performance, but unlike AMD's other technologies, it does this only at certain times, such as when rapidly moving the mouse. This is interpreted as an action-heavy scene where image quality can temporarily be decreased without much noticeable effect. This only works in supported games. AMD Fluid Motion Frames 2 (AFMF2) generates additional frames using AI. It is a driver-level solution that works with all games. HYPR-RX enables Radeon Anti-Lag, Boost, Super Resolution, and AFMF2. In supported games, this is done automatically according to a user's AMD Software settings; otherwise, it requires some configuration in-game. HYPR-RX requires an RDNA3 or RDNA4 GPU.

Radeon Chill lowers performance when the AMD drivers detect idle moments in games and can set frame rate caps. Smart Access Memory enables potential performance boosts on systems that use both AMD Ryzen CPUs and Radeon video cards. Radeon Enhanced Sync reduces screen tearing like v-sync, but it avoids capping frame rates at the monitor's refresh rate. This can reduce the input lag associated with v-sync. This is limited to DirectX 9, 10, and 12.

AMD Link allows users to stream content to mobile devices, compatible Smart TVs, (Note: Supported platforms for AMD Link on Smart TVs include Android TV 7+ and Apple TV fourth generation or later on tvOS 12+.) and other PCs with Radeon video cards, enabling them to use their PC and game on them remotely. It can be used both locally and over the internet. The client requires a free app, which is available via Google Play, Apple App Store, and Amazon Appstore. Support for AMD Link has been removed in AMD Software releases from January 2024 onward, citing the availability of alternatives and to focus driver development resources elsewhere.

Starting in 2026, AMD now optionally allows users to install a large language model AI alongside AMD Software. Users must opt in to this. The software runs locally on the user's hardware. No data is sent to datacenters or cloud computing services, bypassing the need for logins or subscriptions. The frontends are preconfigured to work on AMD hardware and only require users to choose an LLM to use, such as GPT-OSS.

=== History ===
The software was previously known as AMD Radeon Software, AMD Catalyst, and ATI Catalyst. AMD ceased providing 32-bit versions in October 2018.

== Supported hardware ==
AMD Software is targeted to support all function blocks present on a GPU's or an APU's die. Besides instruction code targeted at rendering, this includes display controllers as well as their SIP blocks for video decoding (Unified Video Decoder [UVD]) and video encoding (Video Coding Engine [VCE]).

The device driver also supports AMD TrueAudio, a SIP block to perform sound-related calculations.

=== Supported products ===
AMD Software supports the following AMD (and ATI-tradition) product lines targeted at rendering:

- Graphics processing units (GPUs)
- Accelerated processing units (APUs)

=== Multi-monitor support ===
Starting in Catalyst 14.6 AMD has enabled mixed-resolution support, allowing for a single Eyefinity display group to be created where each monitor runs at a different resolution. The current version may, however, disable any additional display mode and change to a resolution in the one mode available. This feature is made possible through the addition of two new Eyefinity display modes, Fit and Expand, which join the traditional Fill mode. In both Fit and Expand modes, AMD is compensating for the mismatched resolutions by creating a virtual desktop that is of a different resolution from those of the monitors, and then either padding it out or cropping it as necessary.

Before Eyefinity, there was the Windows-only software "HydraVision" (originally acquired from Appian Graphics complete with its development team), a desktop/screen management software mostly providing multi-monitor and virtual-screen management. It has extensive hot-key support.

=== Video acceleration ===
Both of AMD's SIP cores for video acceleration, Video Coding Engine as well as Unified Video Decoder, are supported by AMD Software.

=== Audio acceleration ===
Some AMD products contain SIP cores for audio acceleration branded AMD TrueAudio. Support for this audio acceleration DSP co-processor is part of AMD Software.

Under Microsoft Windows the support for AMD TrueAudio is codenamed "ACP" (for audio co-processor) and implemented via "ACP user service" (amdacpusrsvc.exe), a background service that helps manage audio tasks in games.

Under Linux, AMD TrueAudio is codenamed "acp" as well: some code regarding this can be found in the /drivers/gpu/drm/radeon directory of the Linux kernel sources.

=== Power saving ===
AMD Software includes support for AMD PowerPlay, AMD PowerTune and AMD ZeroCore Power, AMD's set of technologies to reduce energy consumption in their graphics products.

== Supported interfaces ==
=== Rendering ===
The AMD Software device driver supports multiple rendering interfaces, all designed to give the user-space programs, such as video games or CAD software, access to the corresponding SIP blocks.

==== Direct3D ====
Direct3D 12 is available for GCN with version 15.7.1 or higher.

==== Mantle ====
Only the Radeon Software releases targeting Microsoft Windows included support for Mantle. In 2019 starting with version 19.5.1 it was officially discontinued, in favor of DirectX 12 and Vulkan (built upon Mantle) raise in popularity. Windows users who still wish to use Mantle would have to use older version of drivers (prior to 19.5.1).

==== OpenGL ====
OpenGL 4.5 is possible for TeraScale 2 and 3 with Radeon Software Crimson Edition Beta (driver version 15.30 or higher like Crimson Beta 16.2.1). OpenCL support will be lost, but it can be recovered by copying the relevant files from a previous package like Radeon Software 15.11.1 Beta. Beta drivers do not support HDCP.

OpenGL 4.5 is available for GCN with version 16.3 or higher.

OpenGL 4.x compliance requires supporting FP64 shaders. These are implemented by emulation on some TeraScale GPUs.

OpenGL 4.6 is supported in AMD Adrenalin 18.4.1 Graphics Driver on Windows 7 SP1, 10 version 1803 (April 2018 update) for AMD Radeon HD 7700+, HD 8500+ and newer. Released April 2018.

==== Vulkan ====
Vulkan 1.0 is available with Radeon Software Crimson Edition 16.3.2 or higher for GCN.

Vulkan 1.1 with Radeon Software Adrenalin Edition 18.3.3 or higher.

Vulkan 1.2 with Adrenalin 20.1.2 or higher.

Vulkan 1.3 with Adrenalin 22.1.2 or higher.

Vulkan 1.4 with Adrenalin 25.5.1 or higher.

=== Video acceleration ===
The AMD Software device driver supports multiple interfaces, all designed to give user-space programs, such as GStreamer or HandBrake software, access to the corresponding SIP blocks.

=== GPGPU ===
==== ROCm ====
ROCm 6.0 was released on February 14, 2024, and supports the RX 7900 XTX, 7900 XT and 7900 GRE, alongside Radeon Pro W7900 and W7800 graphics cards. Ubuntu 22.04 is natively supported. PyTorch and ONNX Runtime can be used on ROCm 6.0.

==== OpenCL ====
With Catalyst 9.12 support of OpenCL 1.0 was available.

In Catalyst 10.10 OpenCL 1.1 was available.

Catalyst 12.4 Supports OpenCL 1.2.

OpenCL 2.0 driver works since 14.41 for GCN-based Models. This also supports previous OpenCL versions.

TeraScale 2 and 3 chips can use Level 1.2.

==== Close to Metal ====
Close to Metal was a low-level API by AMD which was abandoned in favor of OpenCL.

=== Other ===
AMD HD3D stereoscopic 3D API by AMD.

==== Heterogeneous System Architecture (HSA) ====
With Catalyst 14.1 HSA is possible. AMD main Processor graphic Units and Radeon graphic Card Units work combined.

==== AMD GPU Services (AGS) ====
- GPUOpen: AMD GPU Services (AGS) Library

==== AMD Display Library (ADL) SDK ====
- GPUOpen: AMD Display (ADL) Library
- AMD Display Library (ADL) SDK

== Operating systems support ==
=== Linux ===
The main AMD GPU software stacks are fully supported on Linux: GPUOpen for graphics, and ROCm for compute. GPUOpen is most often merely a supplement, for software utilities, to the free Mesa software stack that is widely distributed and available by default on most Linux distributions.

AMD strives at packaging its software for Linux on its own, not relying solely on Linux distributions. They do so by using the amdgpu and amdgpu-pro shell scripts, and provide package archives for e.g. APT and RPM.

=== Microsoft Windows ===
| Windows support | From version | Last version | | Notes |
| Windows support | From version | x86 | x86-64 | Notes |
|---|---|---|---|---|
| Windows 9x | 02.1 | 4.4/6.2 | —N/a | There were some later releases for these operating systems, up to and including a Windows Me build of Catalyst 6.2 released on February 9, 2006. |
| Windows 2000 | 02.1 | 6.2/7.4 | —N/a | Newer Catalyst versions up to 7.4 will work in 2000 unofficially without any modification; later versions may need .inf file editing |
| Windows XP | 02.1 | 14.4 | | Driver updates and support stopped at AMD Catalyst 14.4 for video cards with support up to DirectX 11 on Hardware, and 10.2 for DirectX 9.0c cards. |
| Windows Vista | 7.2 | 13.12 | | Driver updates and support stopped at AMD Catalyst 13.12 for video cards with support up to DirectX 11. |
| Windows 7 | 9.3 | 18.9.3 | 22.6.1 | Driver updates and support were discontinued for x86 operating systems at version 18.9.3, and for x64 at 22.6.1. |
| Windows 8 | 12.8 | 14.4 | | |
| Windows 8.1 | 13.9 | 17.1.2 | 17.7.1 | Support for driver updates stopped in 2017, though still possible to install. |
| Windows 10 | 15.7 | 18.9.3 | active support | x86 driver support was discontinued to focus on x64 only. |
| Windows 11 | 21.9.1 | —N/a | active support | |

Starting with version 4.9 (released on September 4, 2004) the Catalyst driver package included the ATI Catalyst Control Center, a new software application for manipulating many hardware functions, such as 3D settings, monitor controls and video options. It shows a small 3D preview and allows the user to see how changes to the graphics settings affect the quality of the rendered image. It also shows information about the card itself and the software data. This application requires Microsoft .NET Framework.

Radeon Software 16.x and higher drops support for TeraScale-based GPU models. Vulkan 1.0 support was introduced in Radeon Software 16.3.2.

Radeon Software 17.7.1 is the final driver for Windows 8.1.

Radeon Software 18.9.3 is the final driver for 32-bit Windows 7/10.

AMD Software 22.6.1 is the final driver for Windows 7 (and Windows 8.1 unofficially); 22.6.1 is also the final driver for GCN 1, GCN 2 and GCN 3 based GPUs

==== Issues ====
- Quantity of rendered ahead frames cannot be adjusted
- Triple buffering in D3D cannot be forced
- V-sync in many games under Windows 7 cannot be forced disabled

== See also ==
- AMD software
- ROCm
- GPUOpen
- CodeXL

=== Related technologies ===
- AMD CrossFire
- AMD PowerPlay
- AMD Hybrid Graphics
- ATI Avivo

=== Related topics ===
- ATI/AMD on Free and open-source graphics device drivers
