= Xilleon =

Brand of a system on a chip

AMD Xilleon logotype

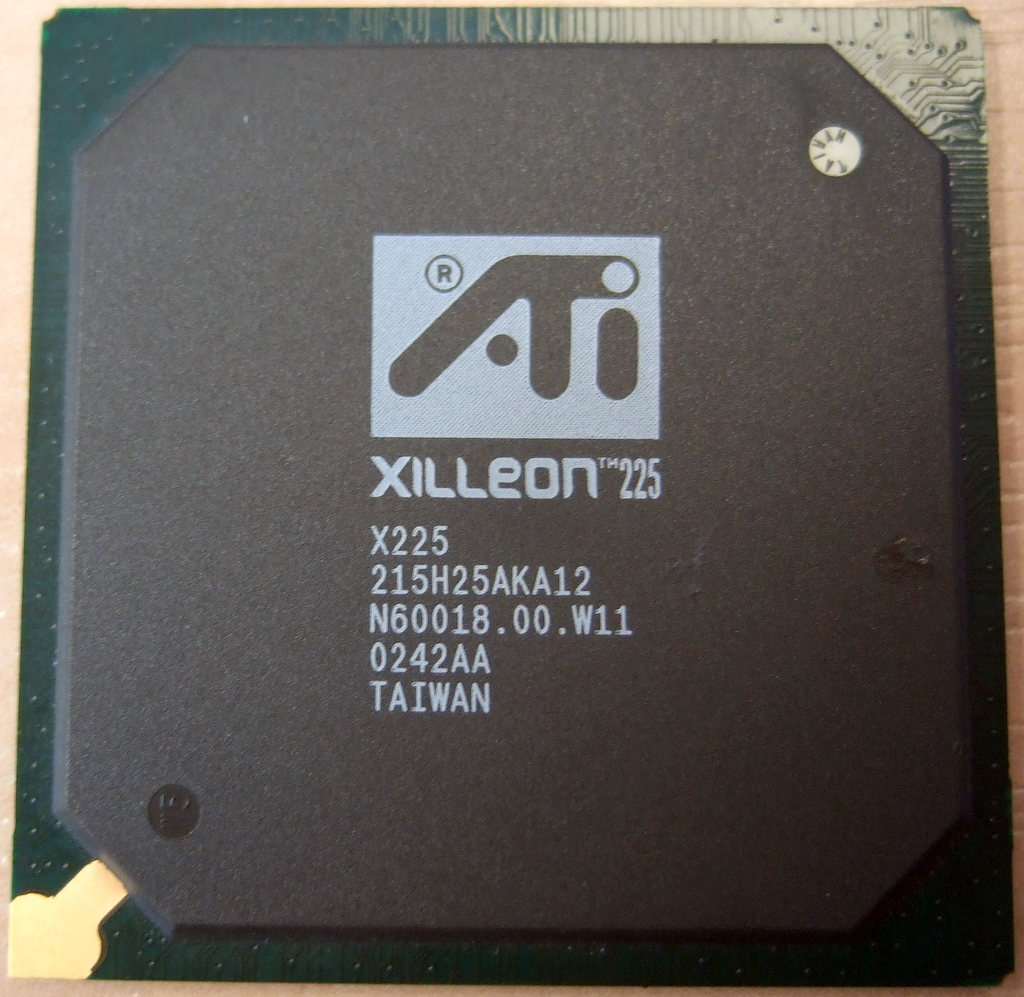
Xilleon x225

Xilleon is a brand for a family of SoCs combining a low-power CPU with ASICs for accelerated video decompression and further functions for major worldwide broadcast networks (including PAL, NTSC, SECAM and ATSC) targeting digital television (i.e. products like set-top boxes, Integrated digital television, digital television adapters, smart TVs, etc.).

== Technical features ==
Xilleon chip internal layout

Most Xilleon-branded SoCs have a

- 300 MHz MIPS 4Kc (MMU, no FPU)
- ASIC simultaneously decompressing two standard-definition television and two high-definition television MPEG-2-compressed streams
- two display controller
- 2D and 3D graphics engine
- conditional access
- transport demultiplexers
- 32/64 bit DDR/SDR interface
- PCI, USB, IR, I2C, I2S, Flash and PATA interfaces

It was revealed that the next generation of AVIVO, named as Unified Video Decoder (UVD) was based on Xilleon video processor to provide hardware decoding of H.264, and VC-1 video codec standards.

Both AMD TrueAudio and AMD's Unified Video Decoder (UVD) are based on the Cadence Tensilica Xtensa processor, which was originally licensed by ATI Technologies Inc. in 2004.

=== List of Xilleon-branded SoCs ===
x210D/H	
x220	
x225	
x226S/H	Similar to x225 but with additional video scalers/mixers and a third serial port.
x240	Integrated digital and analog TV tuner. No external PCI or EIDE. Single memory channel.
x260	

== History ==
Owner's of the brand Xilleon were ATI Technologies, later Advanced Micro Devices, now Broadcom.

While AMD announced the completion of acquisition of ATI Technologies on the third quarter of 2006, the Xilleon products would be sold under the AMD brand as AMD Xilleon.

On August 25, 2008, the Xilleon line was sold to the semiconductor company Broadcom.

A new line of Xilleon video processors for flat panel LCD TVs, named as Xilleon panel processors with four models 410, 411, 420 and 421, were announced on CES 2008. Supporting 1080p video resolution and featuring Technology advanced motion estimation, motion compensation and frame rate conversion technology based on enhanced phase-plane correlation technology, which converts 24 or 60 Hz input video signals to 100 or 120 Hz refresh rates used in most of the LCD TVs by creating additional frames to form a smoother motion.

AMD had signed an agreement with DivX, Inc. to allow several of the future Xilleon video processors to implement hardware DivX video decoding with DivX certification in January 2008. However, as a result of company restructuring, AMD has divested the digital TV chipset business starting from the second quarter of 2008.

== See also ==
- VideoCore
- Broadcom Crystal HD
