= Unified Video Decoder =

AMD's dedicated video decoding ASIC

Unified Video Decoder (UVD, previously called Universal Video Decoder) is the name given to AMD's dedicated video decoding ASIC. There are multiple versions implementing a multitude of video codecs, such as H.264 and VC-1.

UVD was introduced with the Radeon HD 2000 Series and is integrated into some of AMD's GPUs and APUs. UVD occupies a considerable amount of the die surface at the time of its introduction and is not to be confused with AMD's Video Coding Engine (VCE).

As of AMD Raven Ridge (released January 2018), UVD and VCE were succeeded by Video Core Next (VCN).

== Overview ==
The UVD is based on an ATI Xilleon video processor, which is incorporated onto the same die as the GPU and is part of the ATI Avivo HD for hardware video decoding, along with the Advanced Video Processor (AVP). UVD, as stated by AMD, handles decoding of H.264/AVC, and VC-1 video codecs entirely in hardware.

The UVD technology is based on the Cadence Tensilica Xtensa processor, which was originally licensed by ATI Technologies Inc. in 2004.

=== UVD/UVD+ ===
In early versions of UVD, video post-processing is passed to the pixel shaders and OpenCL kernels. MPEG-2 decoding is not performed within UVD, but in the shader processors. The decoder meets the performance and profile requirements of Blu-ray and HD DVD, decoding H.264 bitstreams up to a bitrate of 40 Mbit/s. It has context-adaptive binary arithmetic coding (CABAC) support for H.264/AVC.

Unlike video acceleration blocks in previous generation GPUs, which demanded considerable host-CPU involvement, UVD offloads the entire video-decoder process for VC-1 and H.264 except for video post-processing, which is offloaded to the shaders. MPEG-2 decode is also supported, but the bitstream/entropy decode is not performed for MPEG-2 video in hardware.

Previously, neither ATI Radeon R520 series' ATI Avivo nor NVidia Geforce 7 series' PureVideo assisted front-end bitstream/entropy decompression in VC-1 and H.264 - the host CPU performed this work. UVD handles VLC/CAVLC/CABAC, frequency transform, pixel prediction and inloop deblocking, but passes the post processing to the shaders. Post-processing includes denoising, de-interlacing, and scaling/resizing. AMD has also stated that the UVD component being incorporated into the GPU core only occupies 4.7 mm² in area on 65 nm fabrication process node.

A variation on UVD, called UVD+, was introduced with the Radeon HD 3000 series. UVD+ support HDCP for higher resolution video streams. But UVD+ was also being marketed as simply UVD.

=== UVD 2 ===
The UVD saw a refresh with the release of the Radeon HD 4000 series products. The UVD 2 features full bitstream decoding of H.264/MPEG-4 AVC, VC-1, as well as iDCT level acceleration of MPEG2 video streams. Performance improvements allow dual video stream decoding and Picture-in-Picture mode. This makes UVD2 full BD-Live compliant.

The UVD 2.2 features a re-designed local memory interface and enhances the compatibility with MPEG2/H.264/VC-1 videos. However, it was marketed under the same alias as "UVD 2 Enhanced" as the "special core-logic, available in RV770 and RV730 series of GPUs, for hardware decoding of MPEG2, H.264 and VC-1 video with dual-stream decoding". The nature of UVD 2.2 being an incremental update to the UVD 2 can be accounted for this move.

=== UVD 3 ===
UVD 3 adds support for additional hardware MPEG2 decoding (entropy decode), DivX and Xvid via MPEG-4 Part 2 decoding (entropy decode, inverse transform, motion compensation) and Blu-ray 3D via MVC (entropy decode, inverse transform, motion compensation, in-loop deblocking). along with 120 Hz stereoscopic 3D support, and is optimized to utilize less CPU processing power. UVD 3 also adds support for Blu-ray 3D stereoscopic displays.

=== UVD 4 ===
UVD 4 includes improved frame interpolation with H.264 decoder. UVD 4.2 was introduced with the AMD Radeon Rx 200 series and Kaveri APU."X.ORG Radeon UVD (Unified Video Decoder) Hardware-UVD4.2: KAVERI, KABINI, MULLINS, BONAIRE, HAWAII". May 2016.

=== UVD 5 ===
UVD 5 was introduced with the AMD Radeon R9 285. New to UVD is full support for 4K H.264 video, up to level 5.2 (4Kp60).

=== UVD 6 ===
The UVD 6.0 decoder and Video Coding Engine 3.0 encoder were reported to be first used in GPUs based on GCN 3, including Radeon R9 Fury series, followed by AMD Radeon Rx 300 Series (Pirate Islands GPU family) and AMD Radeon Rx 400 Series (Arctic Islands GPU family). The UVD version in "Fiji" and "Carrizo"-based graphics controller hardware is also announced to provide support for High Efficiency Video Coding (HEVC, H.265) hardware video decoding, up to 4K, 8-bits color (H.265 version 1, main profile); and there is support for the 10bit-color HDR both H.265 and VP9 video codec in the AMD Radeon 400 series with UVD 6.3.

=== UVD 7 ===
The UVD 7.0 decoder and Video Coding Engine 4.0 encoder are included in the Vega-based GPUs. But there is still no fixed function VP9 hardware decoding.

==== UVD 7.2 ====
AMD's Vega20 GPU, present in the Instinct Mi50, Instinct Mi60 and Radeon VII cards, include VCE 4.1 and two UVD 7.2 instances.

=== VCN 1 ===
Starting with the integrated graphics of the Raven Ridge APU (Ryzen 2200/2400G), the former UVD and VCE have been replaced by the new "Video Core Next" (VCN). VCN 1.0 adds full hardware decoding for the VP9 codec.

=== Format support ===
Unified Video Decoder and Video Core Next decoding/encoding support
Implementation		MPEG-1 (Note: All MPEG-2 decoders support MPEG-1 CPB)	H.262 (MPEG-2)	H.263 (MPEG-4 ASP)	VC-1/WMV 9	H.264 (MPEG-4 AVC) (Note: High 10 Profile encoding/decoding isn't supported)		H.265 (HEVC)		VP9	AV1		JPEG	Maximum resolution	Color depth	AMD Fluid Motion
Implementation		Decoding	Decoding	Decoding	Decoding	Decoding	Encoding	Decoding	Encoding	Decoding	Decoding	Encoding	Decoding	Maximum resolution	Color depth	Frame interpolation
UVD 1.0	RV610, RV630, RV670, RV620, RV635	No	No	No	Yes	Yes	No	No	No	No	No	No	No	2K	8-bit	No
UVD 2.0	RS780, RS880, RV770	No	No	No	Yes	Yes	No	No	No	No	No	No	No	2K	8-bit	No
UVD 2.2	RV710, RV730, RV740	No	No	No	Yes	Yes	No	No	No	No	No	No	No	2K	8-bit	No
UVD 2.3	Cedar, Redwood, Juniper, Cypress	No	No	No	Yes	Yes	No	No	No	No	No	No	No	2K	8-bit	No
UVD 3.0	Palm (Wrestler/Ontario), Sumo (Llano), Sumo2 (Llano)	Yes	Yes	Yes	Yes	Yes	No	No	No	No	No	No	No	2K	8-bit	No
UVD 3.1	Barts, Turks, Caicos, Cayman, Seymour	Yes	Yes	Yes	Yes	Yes	No	No	No	No	No	No	No	2K	8-bit	No
UVD 3.2	Aruba (Trinity/Richland), Tahiti	Yes	Yes	Yes	Yes	Yes	VCE (Note: MPEG-4 AVC and HEVC encoding by separate Video Coding Engine)	No	No	No	No	No	No	2K	8-bit	No
UVD 4.0	Cape Verde, Pitcairn	Yes	Yes	Yes	Yes	Yes	VCE	No	No	No	No	No	No	2K	8-bit	Yes
UVD 4.2	Kaveri, Kabini, Mullins, Bonaire, Hawaii	Yes	Yes	Yes	Yes	Yes	VCE	No	No	No	No	No	No	2K	8-bit	Yes
UVD 5.0	Tonga	Yes	Yes	Yes	Yes	Yes	VCE	No	No	No	No	No	No	4K	8-bit	Yes
UVD 6.0	Carrizo, Fiji	Yes	Yes	Yes	Yes	Yes	VCE	Yes	No	No	No	No	Yes	4K	8-bit	Yes
UVD 6.2	Stoney	Yes	Yes	Yes	Yes	Yes	VCE	Yes	No	No	No	No	Yes	4K	10-bit	Yes
UVD 6.3	Polaris, VegaM, Lexa	Yes	Yes	Yes	Yes	Yes	VCE	Yes	VCE	No	No	No	Yes	4K	10-bit	Yes
UVD 7.0	Vega10, Vega12	Yes	Yes	Yes	Yes	Yes	VCE	Yes	VCE	No	No	No	Yes	4K	10-bit	Yes
UVD 7.2	Vega20	Yes	Yes	Yes	Yes	Yes	VCE	Yes	VCE	No	No	No	Yes	4K	10-bit	Yes
VCN 1.0	Raven, Picasso	Yes	Yes	Yes	Yes	Yes	Yes	Yes	Yes	Yes	No	No	Yes	4K	10-bit	Yes
VCN 2.0	Navi10, Navi12, Navi14, Renoir, Cézanne	Yes	Yes	Yes	Yes	Yes	Yes	Yes	Yes	Yes	No	No	Yes	8K	10-bit	No
VCN 2.5	Arcturus	Yes	Yes	Yes	Yes	Yes	Yes	Yes	Yes	Yes	No	No	Yes	8K	10-bit	No
VCN 2.6	Aldebaran	Yes	Yes	Yes	Yes	Yes	Yes	Yes	Yes	Yes	No	No	Yes	8K	10-bit	No
VCN 3.0	Navi24	Yes	Yes	Yes	Yes	Yes	No	Yes	No	Yes	No	No	Yes	8K	10-bit	No
VCN 3.0	Navi21, Navi22, Navi23	Yes	Yes	Yes	Yes	Yes	Yes	Yes	Yes	Yes	Yes	No	Yes	8K	10-bit	No
VCN 3.1.0	Van Gogh	Yes	Yes	Yes	Yes	Yes	Yes	Yes	Yes	Yes	Yes	No	Yes	?	?	?
VCN 3.1.1	Rembrandt	No	No	No	No	Yes	Yes	Yes	Yes	Yes	Yes	No	Yes	8K	10-bit	No
VCN 3.1.2	Raphael	No	No	No	No	Yes	Yes	Yes	Yes	Yes	Yes	No	Yes	?	?	?
VCN 4.0	Navi 3x	No	No	No	No	Yes	Yes	Yes	Yes	Yes	Yes	Yes	Yes	?	?	?
Implementation		Decoding	Decoding	Decoding	Decoding	Decoding	Encoding	Decoding	Encoding	Decoding	Decoding	Encoding	Decoding	Maximum resolution	Color depth	Frame interpolation
Implementation		MPEG-1	H.262 (MPEG-2)	H.263 (MPEG-4 ASP)	VC-1/WMV 9	H.264 (MPEG-4 AVC)		H.265 (HEVC)		VP9	AV1		JPEG	Maximum resolution	Color depth	AMD Fluid Motion

== Availability ==
Most of the Radeon HD 2000 series video cards implement the UVD for hardware decoding of 1080p high definition contents. However, the Radeon HD 2900 series video cards do not include the UVD (though it is able to provide partial functionality through the use of its shaders), which was incorrectly stated to be present on the product pages and package boxes of the add-in partners' products before the launch of the Radeon HD 2900 XT, either stating the card as featuring ATI Avivo HD or explicitly UVD, which only the former statement of ATI Avivo HD is correct. The exclusion of UVD was also confirmed by AMD officials.

UVD2 is implemented in the Radeon RV7x0 and R7x0 series GPUs. This also includes the RS7x0 series used for the AMD 700 chipset series IGP motherboards.

=== Feature overview ===
==== APUs ====
The following table shows features of AMD's processors with 3D graphics, including APUs (see also: List of AMD processors with 3D graphics).

Platform			High, standard and low power														Low and ultra-low power								
Codename	Server	Basic						Toronto																	
Codename	Server	Micro																Kyoto							
Codename	Desktop	Performance													Raphael	Phoenix									
Codename	Desktop	Mainstream	Llano	Trinity	Richland	Kaveri	Kaveri Refresh (Godavari)	Carrizo	Bristol Ridge	Raven Ridge	Picasso	Renoir	Cezanne		Raphael	Phoenix									
Codename	Desktop	Entry	Llano	Trinity	Richland	Kaveri	Kaveri Refresh (Godavari)	Carrizo	Bristol Ridge	Raven Ridge	Picasso	Renoir	Cezanne			Phoenix									
Codename	Desktop	Basic																Kabini				Dalí			
Codename	Mobile	Performance										Renoir	Cezanne	Rembrandt	Dragon Range										
Codename	Mobile	Mainstream	Llano	Trinity	Richland	Kaveri		Carrizo	Bristol Ridge	Raven Ridge	Picasso	Renoir Lucienne	Cezanne Barceló	Rembrandt	Dragon Range	Phoenix									
Codename	Mobile	Entry	Llano	Trinity	Richland	Kaveri		Carrizo	Bristol Ridge	Raven Ridge												Dalí			Mendocino
Codename	Mobile	Basic															Desna, Ontario, Zacate	Kabini, Temash	Beema, Mullins	Carrizo-L	Stoney Ridge	Dalí	Pollock		Mendocino
Codename	Embedded			Trinity		Bald Eagle		Merlin Falcon, Brown Falcon		Great Horned Owl		Grey Hawk					Ontario, Zacate	Kabini	Steppe Eagle, Crowned Eagle, LX-Family		Prairie Falcon	Banded Kestrel		River Hawk	
Released			Aug 2011	Oct 2012	Jun 2013	Jan 2014	2015	Jun 2015	Jun 2016	Oct 2017	Jan 2019	Mar 2020	Jan 2021	Jan 2022	Sep 2022	Jan 2023	Jan 2011	May 2013	Apr 2014	May 2015	Feb 2016	Apr 2019	Jul 2020	Jun 2022	Nov 2022
CPU microarchitecture			K10	Piledriver		Steamroller		Excavator	"Excavator+"	Zen	Zen+	Zen 2	Zen 3	Zen 3+	Zen 4		Bobcat	Jaguar	Puma	Puma+	"Excavator+"	Zen		Zen+	"Zen 2+"
ISA			x86-64 v1	x86-64 v2				x86-64 v3							x86-64 v4		x86-64 v1	x86-64 v2			x86-64 v3				
Socket	Desktop	Performance	—N/a												AM5	—N/a	—N/a								
Socket	Desktop	Mainstream	—N/a					AM4						—N/a	AM5	—N/a	—N/a								
Socket	Desktop	Entry	FM1	FM2		FM2+		FM2+ (Note: For FM2+ Excavator models: A8-7680, A6-7480 & Athlon X4 845.), AM4	AM4					—N/a			—N/a								
Socket	Desktop	Basic	—N/a														—N/a	AM1	—N/a			FP5	—N/a		
Socket	Other		FS1	FS1+, FP2		FP3		FP4		FP5		FP6		FP7	FL1	FP7; FP7r2; FP8	FT1	FT3	FT3b		FP4	FP5	FT5	FP5	FT6
PCI Express version			2.0			3.0								4.0	5.0	4.0	2.0				3.0				
CXL			—N/a														—N/a								
Fab. (nm)			GF 32SHP (HKMG SOI)			GF 28SHP (HKMG bulk)				GF 14LPP (FinFET bulk)	GF 12LP (FinFET bulk)	TSMC N7 (FinFET bulk)		TSMC N6 (FinFET bulk)	CCD: TSMC N5 (FinFET bulk) cIOD: TSMC N6 (FinFET bulk)	TSMC 4nm (FinFET bulk)	TSMC N40 (bulk)	TSMC N28 (HKMG bulk)	GF 28SHP (HKMG bulk)			GF 14LPP (FinFET bulk)		GF 12LP (FinFET bulk)	TSMC N6 (FinFET bulk)
Die area (mm^{2})			228	246		245		245	250	210		156	180	210	CCD: (2x) 70 cIOD: 122	178	75 (+ 28 FCH)	107		?	125	149			~100
Min TDP (W)			35	17				12				10		15	65	35	4.5	4	3.95	10	6			12	8
Max APU TDP (W)			100			95		65						45	170	54	18	25					6	54	15
Max stock APU base clock (GHz)			3	3.8	4.1	4.1		3.7	3.8	3.6	3.7	3.8	4.0	3.3	4.7	4.3	1.75	2.2	2	2.2	3.2	2.6	1.2	3.35	2.8
Max APUs per node (Note: A PC would be one node.)			1														1								
Max core dies per CPU			1												2	1	1								
Max CCX per core die			1									2	1				1								
Max cores per CCX			4										8				2	4			2			4	
Max CPU (Note: An APU combines a CPU and a GPU. Both have cores.) cores per APU			4									8			16	8	2	4			2			4	
Max threads per CPU core			1							2							1					2			
Integer pipeline structure			3+3	2+2						4+2		4+2+1	1+3+3+1+2				1+1+1+1				2+2	4+2			4+2+1
i386, i486, i586, CMOV, NOPL, i686, PAE, NX bit, CMPXCHG16B, AMD-V, RVI, ABM, and 64-bit LAHF/SAHF			Yes														Yes								
IOMMU (Note: Requires firmware support.)			—N/a	v2													v1		v2						
BMI1, AES-NI, CLMUL, and F16C			—N/a	Yes													—N/a	Yes							
MOVBE			—N/a					Yes									—N/a	Yes							
AVIC, BMI2, RDRAND, and MWAITX/MONITORX			—N/a					Yes									—N/a				Yes				
SME (Note: Requires firmware support.), TSME, ADX, SHA, RDSEED, SMAP, SMEP, XSAVEC, XSAVES, XRSTORS, CLFLUSHOPT, CLZERO, and PTE Coalescing			—N/a							Yes							—N/a					Yes			
GMET, WBNOINVD, CLWB, QOS, PQE-BW, RDPID, RDPRU, and MCOMMIT			—N/a									Yes					—N/a								Yes
MPK, VAES			—N/a										Yes				—N/a								
SGX			—N/a														—N/a								
FPUs per core			1	0.5						1							1				0.5	1			
Pipes per FPU			2														2								
FPU pipe width			128-bit									256-bit					80-bit	128-bit							256-bit
CPU instruction set SIMD level			SSE4a (Note: No SSE4. No SSSE3.)	AVX				AVX2							AVX-512		SSSE3	AVX			AVX2				
3DNow!			3DNow!+	—N/a													—N/a								
PREFETCH/PREFETCHW			Yes														Yes								
GFNI			—N/a												Yes		—N/a								
AMX			—N/a														—N/a								
FMA4, LWP, TBM, and XOP			—N/a	Yes						—N/a							—N/a				Yes	—N/a			
FMA3			—N/a	Yes													—N/a				Yes				
AMD XDNA			—N/a													Yes	—N/a								
L1 data cache per core (KiB)			64	16				32									32								
L1 data cache associativity (ways)			2	4				8									8								
L1 instruction caches per core			1	0.5						1							1				0.5	1			
Max APU total L1 instruction cache (KiB)			256	128		192				256					512	256	64		128		96	128			
L1 instruction cache associativity (ways)			2			3				4		8					2				3	4			8
L2 caches per core			1	0.5						1							1				0.5	1			
Max APU total L2 cache (MiB)			4					2				4			16		1	2			1			2	
L2 cache associativity (ways)			16							8							16					8			
Max on-die L3 cache per CCX (MiB)			—N/a							4			16		32		—N/a						4		
Max 3D V-Cache per CCD (MiB)			—N/a							—N/a					64	—N/a	—N/a						—N/a		
Max total in-CCD L3 cache per APU (MiB)			—N/a							4		8	16		64		—N/a						4		
Max. total 3D V-Cache per APU (MiB)			—N/a							—N/a					64	—N/a	—N/a						—N/a		
Max. board L3 cache per APU (MiB)			—N/a							—N/a							—N/a						—N/a		
Max total L3 cache per APU (MiB)			—N/a							4		8	16		128		—N/a						4		
APU L3 cache associativity (ways)			—N/a							16							—N/a						16		
L3 cache scheme			—N/a							Victim							—N/a						Victim		
Max. L4 cache			—N/a														—N/a								
Max stock DRAM support			DDR3-1866		DDR3-2133			DDR3-2133, DDR4-2400	DDR4-2400	DDR4-2933		DDR4-3200, LPDDR4-4266		DDR5-4800, LPDDR5-6400	DDR5-5200	DDR5-5600, LPDDR5x-7500	DDR3L-1333	DDR3L-1600	DDR3L-1866		DDR3-1866, DDR4-2400	DDR4-2400	DDR4-1600	DDR4-3200	LPDDR5-5500
Max DRAM channels per APU			2														1					2	1	2	
Max stock DRAM bandwidth (GB/s) per APU			29.866		34.132			38.400		46.932		68.256		102.400	83.200	120.000	10.666	12.800	14.933		19.200	38.400	12.800	51.200	88.000
GPU microarchitecture			TeraScale 2 (VLIW5)	TeraScale 3 (VLIW4)		GCN 2nd gen		GCN 3rd gen		GCN 5th gen				RDNA 2		RDNA 3	TeraScale 2 (VLIW5)	GCN 2nd gen			GCN 3rd gen	GCN 5th gen			RDNA 2
GPU instruction set			TeraScale instruction set			GCN instruction set								RDNA instruction set			TeraScale instruction set	GCN instruction set							RDNA instruction set
Max stock GPU base clock (MHz)			600	800	844	866		1108		1250	1400	2100		2400	400		538	600	?	847	900	1200	600	1300	1900
Max stock GPU base GFLOPS (Note: Single-precision performance is calculated from the base (or boost) core clock speed based on a FMA operation.)			480	614.4	648.1	886.7		1134.5		1760	1971.2	2150.4		3686.4	102.4		86	?	?	?	345.6	460.8	230.4	1331.2	486.4
3D engine (Note: Unified shaders : texture mapping units : render output units)			Up to 400:20:8	Up to 384:24:6		Up to 512:32:8				Up to 704:44:16		Up to 512:32:8		768:48:8	128:8:4		80:8:4	128:8:4			Up to 192:12:8	Up to 192:12:4	192:12:4	Up to 512:?:?	128:?:?
3D engine			IOMMUv1			IOMMUv2											IOMMUv1		?		IOMMUv2				
Video decoder			UVD 3.0			UVD 4.2		UVD 6.0		VCN 1.0		VCN 2.1	VCN 2.2	VCN 3.1		?	UVD 3.0	UVD 4.0	UVD 4.2		UVD 6.2	VCN 1.0			VCN 3.1
Video encoder			—N/a	VCE 1.0		VCE 2.0		VCE 3.1		VCN 1.0		VCN 2.1	VCN 2.2	VCN 3.1		?	—N/a	VCE 2.0			VCE 3.4	VCN 1.0			VCN 3.1
AMD Fluid Motion			No			Yes				No							No		Yes			No			
GPU power saving			PowerPlay	PowerTune													PowerPlay	PowerTune							
TrueAudio			—N/a			Yes							?				—N/a	Yes							
FreeSync			—N/a			1; 2											—N/a	1; 2							
HDCP (Note: To play protected video content, it also requires card, operating system, driver, and application support. A compatible HDCP display is also needed for this. HDCP is mandatory for the output of certain audio formats, placing additional constraints on the multimedia setup.)			?			1.4				2.2				2.3			?	1.4				2.2			2.3
PlayReady			—N/a							3.0 not yet							—N/a					3.0 not yet			
Supported displays (Note: To feed more than two displays, the additional panels must have native DisplayPort support. Alternatively active DisplayPort-to-DVI/HDMI/VGA adapters can be employed.)			2–3	2–4				3		3 (desktop); 4 (mobile, embedded)		4					2				3	4		4	
/drm/radeon (Note: DRM (Direct Rendering Manager) is a component of the Linux kernel. Support in this table refers to the most current version.)			Yes						—N/a								Yes				—N/a				
/drm/amdgpu			—N/a			Yes											—N/a	Yes							

==== GPUs ====
The following table shows features of AMD/ATI's GPUs (see also: List of AMD graphics processing units).

Name of GPU series	Wonder	Mach	3D Rage	Rage Pro	Rage 128	R100	R200	R300	R400	R500	R600	RV670	R700	Evergreen	Northern Islands		Southern Islands	Sea Islands	Volcanic Islands	Arctic Islands/Polaris	Vega	Navi 1x	Navi 2x	Navi 3x	Navi 4x
Released	1986	1991	Apr; 1996	Mar; 1997	Aug; 1998	Apr; 2000	Aug; 2001	Sep; 2002	May; 2004	Oct; 2005	May; 2007	Nov; 2007	Jun; 2008	Sep; 2009	Oct; 2010	Dec; 2010	Jan; 2012	Sep; 2013	Jun; 2015	Jun 2016, Apr 2017, Aug 2019	Jun 2017, Feb 2019	Jul; 2019	Nov; 2020	Dec; 2022	Feb; 2025
Marketing Name	Wonder	Mach	3D; Rage	Rage; Pro	Rage; 128	Radeon; 7000	Radeon; 8000	Radeon; 9000	Radeon; X700/X800	Radeon; X1000	Radeon; HD 2000	Radeon; HD 3000	Radeon; HD 4000	Radeon; HD 5000	Radeon; HD 6000		Radeon; HD 7000	Radeon; 200	Radeon; 300	Radeon; 400/500/600	Radeon; RX Vega, Radeon VII	Radeon; RX 5000	Radeon; RX 6000	Radeon; RX 7000	Radeon; RX 9000
AMD support	Ended																			Current					
Kind	2D		3D																						
Instruction set architecture	Not publicly known									Multiple (Note: R500 has two instruction sets. Vertex shader cores: "PVS instruction set". Pixel shader cores: "US instruction set".)	TeraScale instruction set						GCN instruction set					RDNA instruction set			
Microarchitecture	Not publicly known					GFX1		GFX2			TeraScale 1 (VLIW5) (GFX3)			TeraScale 2 (VLIW5) (GFX4)	TeraScale 2 (VLIW5) up to 68xx (GFX4)	TeraScale 3 (VLIW4) in 69xx (GFX5)	GCN 1st gen (GFX6)	GCN 2nd gen (GFX7)	GCN 3rd gen (GFX8)	GCN 4th gen (GFX8)	GCN 5th gen (GFX9)	RDNA (GFX10.1)	RDNA 2 (GFX10.3)	RDNA 3 (GFX11)	RDNA 4 (GFX12)
Type	Fixed pipeline (Note: The Radeon R100 Series has programmable pixel shaders, but do not fully comply with DirectX 8 or Pixel Shader 1.0. See article on R100's pixel shaders.)						Programmable pixel & vertex pipelines				Unified shader model														
Direct3D	—N/a		5.0	6.0		7.0	8.1	9.0; 11 (9_2)	9.0b 11 (9_2)	9.0c 11 (9_3)	10.0; 11 (10_0)	10.1; 11 (10_1)		11 (11_0)			11 (11_1); 12 (11_1)	11 (12_0); 12 (12_0)			11 (12_1); 12 (12_1)		11 (12_1); 12 (12_2)		
Shader model	—N/a						1.4	2.0+	2.0b	3.0	4.0	4.1		5.0			5.1	5.1; 6.5			6.7				6.8
OpenGL	—N/a			1.1	1.2	1.3		1.5 (Note: R300, R400 and R500 based cards do not fully comply with OpenGL 2+ as the hardware does not support all types of non-power of two (NPOT) textures.)			3.3			4.5 (Windows), 4.6 (Linux Mesa 25.2+)			4.6 (Note: OpenGL 4+ compliance requires supporting FP64 shaders and these are emulated on some TeraScale chips using 32-bit hardware.)								
Vulkan	—N/a															1.1 (Note: Vulkan support is theoretically possible but has not been implemented in a stable driver.)	1.3 (Note: Vulkan support in Linux relies on the AMDgpu kernel driver, the radeon driver does not support Vulkan.)		1.4						
OpenCL	—N/a										Close to Metal		1.1 (not supported by Mesa)	1.2+ (on Linux: 1.1+ (no Image support on Clover, with Rusticl) with Mesa, 1.2+ on GCN 1.Gen)				2.0+ (Adrenalin driver on Win 7+) (on Linux ROCm, Mesa 1.2+ (no support in Clover, only Rusticl, Mesa, 2.0+ and 3.0 with AMD drivers or AMD ROCm), 5th gen: 2.2 win 10+ and Linux RocM 5.0+				2.2+ and 3.0 Windows 8.1+ and Linux ROCm 5.0+ (Mesa Rusticl 1.2+ and 3.0 (2.1+ and 2.2+))			
HSA / ROCm	—N/a																Yes					?			
Video decoding ASIC	—N/a										Avivo/UVD	UVD+	UVD 2	UVD 2.2	UVD 3		UVD 4	UVD 4.2	UVD 5.0 or 6.0	UVD 6.3	UVD 7 (Note: The UVD and VCE were replaced by the Video Core Next (VCN) ASIC in the Raven Ridge APU implementation of Vega.)	VCN 2.0	VCN 3.0	VCN 4.0	VCN 5.0
Video encoding ASIC	—N/a																VCE 1.0	VCE 2.0	VCE 3.0 or 3.1	VCE 3.4	VCE 4.0	VCN 2.0	VCN 3.0	VCN 4.0	VCN 5.0
Fluid Motion (Note: Video processing for video frame rate interpolation technique. In Windows it works as a DirectShow filter in your player. In Linux, there is no support on the part of drivers and / or community.)	No																	Yes				No		?	
Power saving	?										PowerPlay				PowerTune		PowerTune & ZeroCore Power					?			
TrueAudio	—N/a																	Via dedicated DSP		Via shaders					
FreeSync	—N/a																	1; 2							
HDCP (Note: To play protected video content, it also requires card, operating system, driver, and application support. A compatible HDCP display is also needed for this. HDCP is mandatory for the output of certain audio formats, placing additional constraints on the multimedia setup.)	—N/a										?							1.4		2.2		2.3			
PlayReady	—N/a																			3.0	No	3.0			
Supported displays (Note: More displays may be supported with native DisplayPort connections, or splitting the maximum resolution between multiple monitors with active converters.)						1–2	2							2–6								?			4
Max. resolution	?													2–6 × 2560×1600			2–6 × 4096×2160 @ 30 Hz			2–6 × 5120×2880 @ 60 Hz	3 × 7680×4320 @ 60 Hz	7680×4320 @ 60 Hz PowerColor		7680x4320 @165 Hz	7680x4320
/drm/radeon (Note: DRM (Direct Rendering Manager) is a component of the Linux kernel. AMDgpu is the Linux kernel module. Support in this table refers to the most current version.)						Yes													—N/a						
/drm/amdgpu	—N/a																Yes Kernel 6.19+		Yes						

== Operating system support ==
The UVD SIP core needs to be supported by the device driver, which provides one or more interfaces such as VDPAU, VAAPI or DXVA. One of these interfaces is then used by end-user software, for example VLC media player or GStreamer, to access the UVD hardware and make use of it.

AMD Catalyst, AMD's proprietary graphics device driver that supports UVD, is available for Microsoft Windows and some Linux distributions. Additionally, a free device driver is available, which also supports the UVD hardware.

=== Linux ===
Linux support for the UVD ASIC is provided by the Linux kernel device driver amdgpu.

Support for UVD has been available in AMD's proprietary driver Catalyst version 8.10 since October 2008 through X-Video Motion Compensation (XvMC) or X-Video Bitstream Acceleration (XvBA). Since April 2013, UVD is supported by the free and open-source "radeon" device driver through Video Decode and Presentation API for Unix (VDPAU). An implementation of VDPAU is available as Gallium3D state tracker in Mesa 3D.

On 28 June 2014, Phoronix published some benchmarks on using Unified Video Decoder through the VDPAU interface running MPlayer on Ubuntu 14.04 with version 10.3-testing of Mesa 3D.

=== Windows ===
Microsoft Windows supported UVD since it was launched. UVD currently only supports DXVA (DirectX Video Acceleration) API specification for the Microsoft Windows and Xbox 360 platforms to allow video decoding to be hardware accelerated, thus the media player software also has to support DXVA to be able to utilize UVD hardware acceleration.

=== Others ===
Support for running custom FreeRTOS-based firmware on the Radeon HD 2400's UVD core (based on an Xtensa CPU), interfaced with a STM32 ARM-based board via I^{2}C, was attempted as of January 2012.

== Predecessors and Successor ==
=== Predecessors ===
The Video Shader and ATI Avivo are similar technologies incorporated into previous ATI products.

=== Successor ===
The UVD was succeeded by AMD Video Core Next in the Raven Ridge series of APUs released in October 2017. The VCN combines both encode (VCE) and decode (UVD).

== See also ==
=== Video hardware technologies ===
==== Nvidia ====
- PureVideo - Nvidia
- GeForce 256's Motion Compensation
- High-Definition Video Processor
- Video Processing Engine
- Nvidia NVENC
- Nvidia NVDEC

==== AMD ====
- Video Core Next - AMD
- Video Coding Engine - AMD
- Unified Video Decoder - AMD
- Video Shader - ATI

==== Intel ====
- Quick Sync Video - Intel
- Clear Video - Intel

==== Qualcomm ====
- Qualcomm Hexagon

==== Others ====
- VDPAU – Video Decode and Presentation API for Unix, from NVIDIA
- Video Acceleration API (VA API) – an alternative video acceleration API to XvBA for Linux/UNIX operating-system that supports XvBA as a backend
- X-Video Bitstream Acceleration (XvBA) – AMD's future hardware acceleration API for Linux/UNIX operating-system.
- Bit stream decoder (BSD)
- Comparison of AMD graphics processing units
- DirectX Video Acceleration (DxVA) – Microsoft's hardware acceleration API for Microsoft Windows based operating-system.
