= ATI Avivo =

Set of hardware and low level software features

- Developer(s): ATI
- Initial release: 2005; 20 years ago
- Website: ati.amd.com/technology/Avivo

ATI Avivo is a set of hardware and low level software features present on the ATI Radeon R520 family of GPUs and all later ATI Radeon products. ATI Avivo was designed to offload video decoding, encoding, and post-processing from a computer's CPU to a compatible GPU. ATI Avivo compatible GPUs have lower CPU usage when a player and decoder software that support ATI Avivo is used. ATI Avivo has been long superseded by Unified Video Decoder (UVD) and Video Coding Engine (VCE).

== Background ==
The GPU wars between ATI and NVIDIA have resulted in GPUs with ever-increasing processing power since early 2000s. To parallel this increase in speed and power, both GPU makers needed to increase video quality as well, in 3D graphics applications the focus in increasing quality has mainly fallen on anti-aliasing and anisotropic filtering. However it has dawned upon both companies that video quality on the PC would need improvement as well and the current APIs provided by both companies have not seen many improvements over a few generations of GPUs. Therefore, ATI decided to revamp its GPU's video processing capability with ATI Avivo, in order to compete with NVIDIA PureVideo API.

In the time of release of the latest generation Radeon HD series, the successor, the ATI Avivo HD was announced, and was presented on every Radeon HD 2600 and 2400 video cards to be available July, 2007 after NVIDIA announced similar hardware acceleration solution, PureVideo HD.

In 2011 Avivo is renamed to AMD Media Codec Package, an optional component of the AMD Catalyst software. The last version is released in August 2012. As of 2013, the package is no longer offered by AMD.

== Features ==
=== ATI Avivo ===
During capturing, ATI Avivo amplifies the source, automatically adjust its brightness and contrast. ATI Avivo implements 12-bit transform to reduce data loss during conversion; it also utilizes motion adaptive 3D comb filter, automatic color control, automatic gain control, hardware noise reduction and edge enhancement technologies for better video playback quality.

In decoding, the GPU core supports hardware decoding of H.264, VC-1, WMV9, and MPEG-2 videos to lower CPU utilization (the bitstream processing/entropy decoding still requires CPU processing). ATI Avivo supports vector adaptive de-interlacing and video scaling to reduce jaggies, and spatial/temporal dithering, which attempts to simulate 10-bit color quality on 8-bit and 6-bit displays during process stage.

=== ATI Avivo HD ===
The successor of ATI Avivo is the ATI Avivo HD, which consists of several parts: integrated 5.1 surround sound HDMI audio controller, dual integrated HDCP encryption key for each DVI port (to reduce license costs), the Theater 200 chip for VIVO capabilities, the Xilleon chip for TV overscan and underscan correction, the Theater 200 chip as well as the originally-presented ATI Avivo Video Converter.

However, most of the important hardware decoding functions of ATI Avivo HD are provided by the accompanied Unified Video Decoder (UVD) and the Advanced Video Processor (AVP) which supports hardware decoding of H.264/AVC and VC-1 videos (and included bitstream processing/entropy decoding which was absent in last generation ATI Avivo). For MPEG-1, MPEG-2, and MPEG-4/DivX videos, motion compensation and iDCT (inverse discrete cosine transform) will be done instead.

The AVP retrieves the video from memory; handles scaling, de-interlacing and colour correction; and writes it back to memory. The AVP also uses 12-bit transform to reduce data loss during conversion, same as previous generation ATI Avivo.

HDMI supports the transfer of video together with 8-channel 96 kHz 24-bit digital audio (and optionally Dolby TrueHD and DTS-HD Master Audio streams for external decoding by AV receivers, since HDMI 1.3). Integration of an audio controller in the GPU core capable of surround sound output eliminates the need for S/PDIF connection from motherboard or sound card to the video card, for synchronous video and audio output via HDMI cable.

The Radeon HD 2900 series lacked the UVD feature, but still was given the ATI Avivo HD label.

=== ATI Avivo Video Converter ===
ATI has also released a transcoder software dubbed "ATI Avivo Video Converter", which supports transcoding between H.264, VC-1, WMV9, WMV9 PMC, MPEG-2, MPEG-4, DivX video formats, as well as formats used in iPod and PSP. Earlier versions of this software uses only the CPU for transcoding, but have been locked for exclusive use with the ATI X1000 series of GPUs. Software modifications have made it possible to use version 1.12 of converter on a wider range of graphics adapters. The ATI Avivo Video Converter for Windows Vista was available with the release of Catalyst 7.9 (September 2007 release, version 8.411).

The ATI Avivo Video Converter with GPU transcoding acceleration is now also available for use with HD 4800 and HD 4600 series graphics cards and is included with the Catalyst 8.12 drivers. Support for Vista x64 is available via a separate download starting with Catalyst 9.6 (9-6_vista32-64_xcode). The new software is faster than Badaboom, an encoder that uses NVIDIA's CUDA to accelerate encoding, but has a higher CPU utilization than Badaboom. One review reported visual problems with iPod and WMV playback using Catalyst version 8.12, and although concluding there was no clear winners, if forced to choose would go with the Avivo converter.

== Software support ==
- ArcSoft TotalMedia Theatre
- Corel WinDVD
- Media Player Classic Home Cinema
- MediaPortal
- Cyberlink PowerDVD
- Microsoft Windows Vista internal MPEG-2 decoder
- Nero
- All Linux players supporting Xv output (with AMD Catalyst 9.1 or newer)

== See also ==
- Unified Video Decoder (UVD)
- Video Coding Engine (VCE)
