= Video Shader =

Graphics card feature

Video Shader is a graphics card feature that ATI advertises on their R300 and R400 cards. The R500 card is advertised as having Video Shader HD. Video shader is a feature that describes ATI's process of using Pixel Shaders to improve quality of video playback. It can also be used to perform post-processing, like adding a film grain, or adding other special effects.

One feature of Video Shader is ATI Full Stream. Full Stream detects the edges of video compression blocks and uses a pixel shader based filter to smooth the picture hiding the blocks. Another is Video Soap, which reduces video noise.

Other features are DXVA support for Hardware Motion Compensation, iDCT, DCT and color space conversion. Support for Hardware Motion Compensation, iDCT, DCT and color space conversion is also listed.

Video Shader has been superseded by Unified Video Decoder (UVD) and Video Coding Engine (VCE).

== See also ==
- Unified Video Decoder (UVD)
- Video Coding Engine (VCE)
