= Video Core Next =

AMD hardware video codec, built into AMD GPUs and APUs

Video Core Next is AMD's brand for its dedicated video encoding and decoding hardware core. It is a family of hardware accelerator designs for encoding and decoding video, and is built into AMD's GPUs and APUs since AMD Raven Ridge, released January 2018.

== Background ==
Video Core Next is AMD's successor to both the Unified Video Decoder and Video Coding Engine designs, which are hardware accelerators for video decoding and encoding, respectively. It can be used to decode, encode and transcode ("sync") video streams, for example, a DVD or Blu-ray Disc to a format appropriate to, for example, a smartphone. Unlike video encoding on a CPU or a general-purpose GPU, Video Core Next is a dedicated hardware core on the processor die. This application-specific integrated circuit (ASIC) allows for more power-efficient video processing.

== Feature set ==
All versions of VCN support H.264/MPEG-4 AVC Encode/Decode, HEVC (H.265) Encode/Decode, and VP9 Decode. 10-bit color depth in the P010 format is supported. VCN 1.0 supports up to 4K resolution. VCN 2.0 and beyond supports up to 8K. Support for H.264 and H.265 Encode methods differ among generations (see below). VC-1 Decode is not supported since VCN 3.0.33.

VCN 2.0 was introduced with RDNA 1 and the Renoir APU. The feature set remains the same as VCN 1.0.

VCN 3.0 was introduced with RDNA 2 and is implemented in the Playstation 5 and Xbox Series S/X. VCN 3.0 implements H.264 B-frames, which was present in Video Coding Engine 2.0 but taken out with VCE 3.0, and AV1 Decoding.

VCN 4.0 was introduced with RDNA 3 and adds AV1 encode. H.264 quality is higher with VCN 4.0 (as part of RDNA 3) compared to previous generations, but still somewhat lags behind Intel and Nvidia hardware codecs - though many critics believed it was already good enough to be utilized more often.

VCN 5.0 was introduced with RDNA 4 and enhances overall encoding further, finally closing the gap between AMD and Intel/Nvidia hardware encoding. Higher end RDNA 4 GPUs also have 2 VCN units instead of 1, like equivalent Ada Lovelace/Blackwell GPUs, to improve video encoding/decoding latency and performance.

There is no support for encoding or decoding in YUV422 and YUV444 in H.264 and H.265.

Video Core Next Video decoding/encoding support
| VCN Generation | GPU code name | JPEG | VC-1 / WMV 9 | H.262 (MPEG-2) | H.264 (MPEG-4 AVC) | | | | H.265 (HEVC) | | | VP9 | AV1 | |
| VCN Generation | GPU code name | Decode | Decode | Decode | Decode | Encode | | | Decode | Encode | | Decode | Decode | Encode |
| VCN Generation | GPU code name | Decode | Decode | Decode | Decode | B-frame (Note: B-frames allow for higher-quality I and P frame to be used, improving the overall video quality in high-motion sections. There is no B-frame support for H.265 at any version.) | Pre-analysis (Note: Pre-analysis improves quality in high motion scenes at the cost of latency. This pass works in both H.264 and H.265.) | Resolution, color depth | Decode | Chroma | Resolution, color depth | Decode | Decode | Encode |
|---|---|---|---|---|---|---|---|---|---|---|---|---|---|---|
| VCN 1.0 | Raven, Picasso | Yes | Yes | Yes | Yes | No | ? | 4K @ 10b | Yes | 4:2:0 | 4K @ 10b | Yes | No | No |
| VCN 2.0 | Navi 1x | Yes | Yes | Yes | Yes | No | Yes | 4K @ 8b | Yes | 4:2:0 | 4K @ 10b | Yes | No | No |
| VCN 2.2 | Renoir, Lucienne, Cezanne, Barcelo | Yes | Yes | Yes | Yes | No | Yes | 4K @ 8b | Yes | 4:2:0 | 4K @ 10b | Yes | No | No |
| VCN 2.5 | Arcturus | Yes | Yes | Yes | Yes | No | Yes | 4K @ 8b | Yes | 4:2:0 | 4K @ 10b | Yes | No | No |
| VCN 2.6 | Aldebaran | Yes | Yes | Yes | Yes | No | Yes | 4K @ 8b | Yes | 4:2:0 | 4K @ 10b | Yes | No | No |
| VCN 3.0 | Navi 21, Navi 22, Navi 23 | Yes | Yes | Yes | Yes | Yes | Yes | 4K @ 8b | Yes | 4:2:0 | 8K @ 10b | Yes | Yes | No |
| VCN 3.0.33 | Navi 24 | No | No | No | Yes | No | No | No | Yes | No | No | Yes | No | No |
| VCN 3.1.0 | Van Gogh | Yes | No | No | Yes | Yes | Yes | 4K @ 8b | Yes | 4:2:0 | 8K @ 10b | Yes | Yes | No |
| VCN 3.1.1 | Rembrandt, Mendocino | Yes | No | No | Yes | Yes | Yes | 4K @ 8b | Yes | 4:2:0 | 8K @ 10b | Yes | Yes | No |
| VCN 3.1.2 | Raphael, Dragon Range | Yes | No | No | Yes | Yes | Yes | 4K @ 8b | Yes | 4:2:0 | 8K @ 10b | Yes | Yes | No |
| VCN 4.0 | Navi 3x, Phoenix | Yes | No | No | Yes | Yes | Yes | 4K @ 8b | Yes | 4:2:0 | 8K @ 10b | Yes | Yes | 8K @ 10b |
| VCN 5.0 | Navi 4x | Yes | No | No | Yes | Yes | Yes | 4K @ 8b | Yes | 4:2:0 | 8K @ 10b | Yes | Yes | 8K @ 10b |

== Quality ==
Early versions of AMD VCN had lower overall quality (VMAF) compared to offerings from Intel and Nvidia. B-frame support narrowed the gap, but did not eliminate it; further improvements, including pre-analysis, resulted in nearly equivalent performance to competitors at the release of VCN 4.0.

Despite a lack of B-frame support, H.265 provides better quality (VMAF) and near-identical speed for the same bitrate compared to H.264 on VCN 2.0, 3.0, and 4.0.

== See also ==
=== Video hardware technologies ===
==== Nvidia ====
- PureVideo - Nvidia
- GeForce 256's Motion Compensation
- High-Definition Video Processor
- Video Processing Engine
- Nvidia NVENC
- Nvidia NVDEC

==== AMD ====
- Video Core Next - AMD
- Video Coding Engine - AMD
- Unified Video Decoder - AMD
- Video Shader - ATI

==== Intel ====
- Quick Sync Video - Intel
- Clear Video - Intel

Qualcomm

- Qualcomm Hexagon
