= Video Coding Engine =

AMD hardware accelerator for encoding MP4 H.264 videos, built into AMD GPU's

Video Code Engine (VCE; earlier referred to as Video Coding Engine, Video Compression Engine or Video Codec Engine in official documentation) is AMD's video encoding application-specific integrated circuit implementing the video codec H.264/MPEG-4 AVC. Since 2012 it was integrated into all of their GPUs and APUs except Oland.

VCE was introduced with the Radeon HD 7000 series on 22 December 2011. VCE occupies a considerable amount of the die surface at the time of its introduction and is not to be confused with AMD's Unified Video Decoder (UVD).

As of AMD Raven Ridge (released January 2018), UVD and VCE were succeeded by Video Core Next (VCN).

== Overview ==
In "full-fixed mode" the entire computation is done by the fixed-function VCE unit. Full-fixed mode can be accessed through the OpenMAX IL API.

The entropy encoding block of the VCE ASIC is also separately accessible, enabling "hybrid mode". In "hybrid mode" most of the computation is done by the 3D engine of the GPU. Using AMD's Accelerated Parallel Programming SDK and OpenCL developers can create hybrid encoders that pair custom motion estimation, inverse discrete cosine transform and motion compensation with the hardware entropy encoding to achieve faster than real-time encoding.

The handling of video data involves computation of data compression algorithms and possibly of video processing algorithms. As the template compression methods shows, lossy video compression algorithms involve the steps: motion estimation (ME), discrete cosine transform (DCT), and entropy encoding (EC).

AMD Video Code Engine (VCE) is a full hardware implementation of the video codec H.264/MPEG-4 AVC. It is capable of delivering 1080p at 60 frames/sec. Because its entropy encoding block is also a separately accessible Video Codec Engine, it can be operated in two modes: full-fixed mode and hybrid mode.

By employing AMD APP SDK, available for Linux and Microsoft Windows, developers can create hybrid encoders that pair custom motion estimation, inverse discrete cosine transform and motion compensation with the hardware entropy encoding to achieve faster than real-time encoding. In hybrid mode, only the entropy encoding block of the VCE unit is used, while the remaining computation is offloaded to the 3D engine of the GPU, so the computing scales with the number of available compute units (CUs).

=== VCE 1.0 ===
VCE Version 1.0 supports H.264 YUV420 (I & P frames), H.264 SVC Temporal Encode VCE, and Display Encode Mode (DEM).

It can be found on:

- Piledriver-based
  - Trinity APUs (Ax-5xxx, e.g. A10-5800K)
  - Richland APUs (Ax-6xxx, e.g. A10-6800K)
- GPUs of the Southern Islands generation (GCN1: CAYMAN, ARUBA (Trinity/Richland), CAPE VERDE, PITCAIRN, TAHITI). These are
  - Radeon HD 7700 series (except HD 7790 with VCE 2.0)
  - Radeon HD 7800 series
  - Radeon HD 7900 series
  - Radeon HD 8570 to 8990 (except HD 8770 with VCE 2.0)
  - Radeon R7 250E, 250X, 265 / R9 270, 270X, 280, 280X
  - Radeon R7 360, 370, 455 / R9 370, 370X
  - Mobile Radeon HD 77x0M to HD 7970M
  - Mobile Radeon HD 8000-Series
  - Mobile Radeon Rx M2xx Series (except R9 M280X with VCE 2.0 and R9 M295X with VCE 3.0)
  - Mobile Radeon R5 M330 to R9 M390
  - FirePro cards with 1st Generation GCN (GCN1) (Except W2100, which is Oland XT)

=== VCE 2.0 ===
Compared to the first version, VCE 2.0 adds H.264 YUV444 (I-Frames), B-frames for H.264 YUV420, and improvements to the DEM (Display Encode Mode), which results in a better encoding quality.

It can be found on:

- Steamroller-based
  - Kaveri APUs (Ax-7xxx, e.g. A10-7850K)
  - Godavari APUs (Ax-7xxx, e.g. A10-7890K)
- Jaguar-based
  - Kabini APUs (e.g. Athlon 5350, Sempron 2650)
  - Temash APUs (e.g. A6-1450, A4-1200)
- Puma-based
  - Beema and Mullins
- GPUs of the Sea Islands generation as well Bonaire or Hawaii GPUs (2nd Generation Graphics Core Next), such as
  - Radeon HD 7790, 8770
  - Radeon R7 260, 260X / R9 290, 290X, 295X2
  - Radeon R7 360 / R9 390, 390X
  - Mobile Radeon R9 M280X
  - Mobile Radeon R9 M385, M385X
  - Mobile Radeon R9 M470, M470X
  - FirePro W4300, W5100, W8100, W9100, S9100, S9150, S9170
  - Mobile FirePro M6100, W6150M, W6170M

=== VCE 3.0 ===
Video Code Engine 3.0 (VCE 3.0) technology features a new high-quality video scaling and - since version 3.4 - High Efficiency Video Coding (HEVC/H.265).

It, together with UVD 6.0, can be found on 3rd generation of Graphics Core Next (GCN3) with "Tonga" and "Fiji" (VCE 3.0) based graphics controller hardware, which is now used AMD Radeon Rx 300 series (Pirate Islands GPU family) and VCE 3.4 by actual AMD Radeon Rx 400 series and AMD Radeon 500 series (both Polaris GPU family).

- Tonga: Radeon R9 285, 380, 380X; Mobile Radeon R9 M390X, M395, M395X, M485X
- Tonga XT: FirePro W7100, S7100X, S7150, S7150 X2
- Fiji: Radeon R9 Fury, Fury X, Nano; Radeon Pro Duo (2016); FirePro S9300, W7170M; Instinct MI8
- Polaris: RX 460, 470, 480; RX 550, 560, 570, 580; Radeon Pro Duo (2017)

AMD's Carrizo platform features VCE 3.1, retaining the same capabilities as the VCE found in "Fiji" and "Tonga".

Stoney Ridge features a cut down version of VCE 3.4 without HEVC/H.265 encoding and is accompanied by a UVD 6.2 engine.

VCE 3.0 removes support for H.264 B-frames.

=== VCE 4.0 ===
The Video Code Engine 4.0 encoder and UVD 7.0 decoder are included in the Vega-based GPUs.

==== VCE 4.1 ====
AMD's Vega20 GPU, present in the Instinct Mi50, Instinct Mi60 and Radeon VII cards, include VCE 4.1 and two UVD 7.2 instances.

=== Feature overview ===
==== APUs ====
The following table shows features of AMD's processors with 3D graphics, including APUs (see also: List of AMD processors with 3D graphics).

Platform			High, standard and low power														Low and ultra-low power								
Codename	Server	Basic						Toronto																	
Codename	Server	Micro																Kyoto							
Codename	Desktop	Performance													Raphael	Phoenix									
Codename	Desktop	Mainstream	Llano	Trinity	Richland	Kaveri	Kaveri Refresh (Godavari)	Carrizo	Bristol Ridge	Raven Ridge	Picasso	Renoir	Cezanne		Raphael	Phoenix									
Codename	Desktop	Entry	Llano	Trinity	Richland	Kaveri	Kaveri Refresh (Godavari)	Carrizo	Bristol Ridge	Raven Ridge	Picasso	Renoir	Cezanne			Phoenix									
Codename	Desktop	Basic																Kabini				Dalí			
Codename	Mobile	Performance										Renoir	Cezanne	Rembrandt	Dragon Range										
Codename	Mobile	Mainstream	Llano	Trinity	Richland	Kaveri		Carrizo	Bristol Ridge	Raven Ridge	Picasso	Renoir Lucienne	Cezanne Barceló	Rembrandt	Dragon Range	Phoenix									
Codename	Mobile	Entry	Llano	Trinity	Richland	Kaveri		Carrizo	Bristol Ridge	Raven Ridge												Dalí			Mendocino
Codename	Mobile	Basic															Desna, Ontario, Zacate	Kabini, Temash	Beema, Mullins	Carrizo-L	Stoney Ridge	Dalí	Pollock		Mendocino
Codename	Embedded			Trinity		Bald Eagle		Merlin Falcon, Brown Falcon		Great Horned Owl		Grey Hawk					Ontario, Zacate	Kabini	Steppe Eagle, Crowned Eagle, LX-Family		Prairie Falcon	Banded Kestrel		River Hawk	
Released			Aug 2011	Oct 2012	Jun 2013	Jan 2014	2015	Jun 2015	Jun 2016	Oct 2017	Jan 2019	Mar 2020	Jan 2021	Jan 2022	Sep 2022	Jan 2023	Jan 2011	May 2013	Apr 2014	May 2015	Feb 2016	Apr 2019	Jul 2020	Jun 2022	Nov 2022
CPU microarchitecture			K10	Piledriver		Steamroller		Excavator	"Excavator+"	Zen	Zen+	Zen 2	Zen 3	Zen 3+	Zen 4		Bobcat	Jaguar	Puma	Puma+	"Excavator+"	Zen		Zen+	"Zen 2+"
ISA			x86-64 v1	x86-64 v2				x86-64 v3							x86-64 v4		x86-64 v1	x86-64 v2			x86-64 v3				
Socket	Desktop	Performance	—N/a												AM5	—N/a	—N/a								
Socket	Desktop	Mainstream	—N/a					AM4						—N/a	AM5	—N/a	—N/a								
Socket	Desktop	Entry	FM1	FM2		FM2+		FM2+ (Note: For FM2+ Excavator models: A8-7680, A6-7480 & Athlon X4 845.), AM4	AM4					—N/a			—N/a								
Socket	Desktop	Basic	—N/a														—N/a	AM1	—N/a			FP5	—N/a		
Socket	Other		FS1	FS1+, FP2		FP3		FP4		FP5		FP6		FP7	FL1	FP7; FP7r2; FP8	FT1	FT3	FT3b		FP4	FP5	FT5	FP5	FT6
PCI Express version			2.0			3.0								4.0	5.0	4.0	2.0				3.0				
CXL			—N/a														—N/a								
Fab. (nm)			GF 32SHP (HKMG SOI)			GF 28SHP (HKMG bulk)				GF 14LPP (FinFET bulk)	GF 12LP (FinFET bulk)	TSMC N7 (FinFET bulk)		TSMC N6 (FinFET bulk)	CCD: TSMC N5 (FinFET bulk) cIOD: TSMC N6 (FinFET bulk)	TSMC 4nm (FinFET bulk)	TSMC N40 (bulk)	TSMC N28 (HKMG bulk)	GF 28SHP (HKMG bulk)			GF 14LPP (FinFET bulk)		GF 12LP (FinFET bulk)	TSMC N6 (FinFET bulk)
Die area (mm^{2})			228	246		245		245	250	210		156	180	210	CCD: (2x) 70 cIOD: 122	178	75 (+ 28 FCH)	107		?	125	149			~100
Min TDP (W)			35	17				12				10		15	65	35	4.5	4	3.95	10	6			12	8
Max APU TDP (W)			100			95		65						45	170	54	18	25					6	54	15
Max stock APU base clock (GHz)			3	3.8	4.1	4.1		3.7	3.8	3.6	3.7	3.8	4.0	3.3	4.7	4.3	1.75	2.2	2	2.2	3.2	2.6	1.2	3.35	2.8
Max APUs per node (Note: A PC would be one node.)			1														1								
Max core dies per CPU			1												2	1	1								
Max CCX per core die			1									2	1				1								
Max cores per CCX			4										8				2	4			2			4	
Max CPU (Note: An APU combines a CPU and a GPU. Both have cores.) cores per APU			4									8			16	8	2	4			2			4	
Max threads per CPU core			1							2							1					2			
Integer pipeline structure			3+3	2+2						4+2		4+2+1	1+3+3+1+2				1+1+1+1				2+2	4+2			4+2+1
i386, i486, i586, CMOV, NOPL, i686, PAE, NX bit, CMPXCHG16B, AMD-V, RVI, ABM, and 64-bit LAHF/SAHF			Yes														Yes								
IOMMU (Note: Requires firmware support.)			—N/a	v2													v1		v2						
BMI1, AES-NI, CLMUL, and F16C			—N/a	Yes													—N/a	Yes							
MOVBE			—N/a					Yes									—N/a	Yes							
AVIC, BMI2, RDRAND, and MWAITX/MONITORX			—N/a					Yes									—N/a				Yes				
SME (Note: Requires firmware support.), TSME, ADX, SHA, RDSEED, SMAP, SMEP, XSAVEC, XSAVES, XRSTORS, CLFLUSHOPT, CLZERO, and PTE Coalescing			—N/a							Yes							—N/a					Yes			
GMET, WBNOINVD, CLWB, QOS, PQE-BW, RDPID, RDPRU, and MCOMMIT			—N/a									Yes					—N/a								Yes
MPK, VAES			—N/a										Yes				—N/a								
SGX			—N/a														—N/a								
FPUs per core			1	0.5						1							1				0.5	1			
Pipes per FPU			2														2								
FPU pipe width			128-bit									256-bit					80-bit	128-bit							256-bit
CPU instruction set SIMD level			SSE4a (Note: No SSE4. No SSSE3.)	AVX				AVX2							AVX-512		SSSE3	AVX			AVX2				
3DNow!			3DNow!+	—N/a													—N/a								
PREFETCH/PREFETCHW			Yes														Yes								
GFNI			—N/a												Yes		—N/a								
AMX			—N/a														—N/a								
FMA4, LWP, TBM, and XOP			—N/a	Yes						—N/a							—N/a				Yes	—N/a			
FMA3			—N/a	Yes													—N/a				Yes				
AMD XDNA			—N/a													Yes	—N/a								
L1 data cache per core (KiB)			64	16				32									32								
L1 data cache associativity (ways)			2	4				8									8								
L1 instruction caches per core			1	0.5						1							1				0.5	1			
Max APU total L1 instruction cache (KiB)			256	128		192				256					512	256	64		128		96	128			
L1 instruction cache associativity (ways)			2			3				4		8					2				3	4			8
L2 caches per core			1	0.5						1							1				0.5	1			
Max APU total L2 cache (MiB)			4					2				4			16		1	2			1			2	
L2 cache associativity (ways)			16							8							16					8			
Max on-die L3 cache per CCX (MiB)			—N/a							4			16		32		—N/a						4		
Max 3D V-Cache per CCD (MiB)			—N/a							—N/a					64	—N/a	—N/a						—N/a		
Max total in-CCD L3 cache per APU (MiB)			—N/a							4		8	16		64		—N/a						4		
Max. total 3D V-Cache per APU (MiB)			—N/a							—N/a					64	—N/a	—N/a						—N/a		
Max. board L3 cache per APU (MiB)			—N/a							—N/a							—N/a						—N/a		
Max total L3 cache per APU (MiB)			—N/a							4		8	16		128		—N/a						4		
APU L3 cache associativity (ways)			—N/a							16							—N/a						16		
L3 cache scheme			—N/a							Victim							—N/a						Victim		
Max. L4 cache			—N/a														—N/a								
Max stock DRAM support			DDR3-1866		DDR3-2133			DDR3-2133, DDR4-2400	DDR4-2400	DDR4-2933		DDR4-3200, LPDDR4-4266		DDR5-4800, LPDDR5-6400	DDR5-5200	DDR5-5600, LPDDR5x-7500	DDR3L-1333	DDR3L-1600	DDR3L-1866		DDR3-1866, DDR4-2400	DDR4-2400	DDR4-1600	DDR4-3200	LPDDR5-5500
Max DRAM channels per APU			2														1					2	1	2	
Max stock DRAM bandwidth (GB/s) per APU			29.866		34.132			38.400		46.932		68.256		102.400	83.200	120.000	10.666	12.800	14.933		19.200	38.400	12.800	51.200	88.000
GPU microarchitecture			TeraScale 2 (VLIW5)	TeraScale 3 (VLIW4)		GCN 2nd gen		GCN 3rd gen		GCN 5th gen				RDNA 2		RDNA 3	TeraScale 2 (VLIW5)	GCN 2nd gen			GCN 3rd gen	GCN 5th gen			RDNA 2
GPU instruction set			TeraScale instruction set			GCN instruction set								RDNA instruction set			TeraScale instruction set	GCN instruction set							RDNA instruction set
Max stock GPU base clock (MHz)			600	800	844	866		1108		1250	1400	2100		2400	400		538	600	?	847	900	1200	600	1300	1900
Max stock GPU base GFLOPS (Note: Single-precision performance is calculated from the base (or boost) core clock speed based on a FMA operation.)			480	614.4	648.1	886.7		1134.5		1760	1971.2	2150.4		3686.4	102.4		86	?	?	?	345.6	460.8	230.4	1331.2	486.4
3D engine (Note: Unified shaders : texture mapping units : render output units)			Up to 400:20:8	Up to 384:24:6		Up to 512:32:8				Up to 704:44:16		Up to 512:32:8		768:48:8	128:8:4		80:8:4	128:8:4			Up to 192:12:8	Up to 192:12:4	192:12:4	Up to 512:?:?	128:?:?
3D engine			IOMMUv1			IOMMUv2											IOMMUv1		?		IOMMUv2				
Video decoder			UVD 3.0			UVD 4.2		UVD 6.0		VCN 1.0		VCN 2.1	VCN 2.2	VCN 3.1		?	UVD 3.0	UVD 4.0	UVD 4.2		UVD 6.2	VCN 1.0			VCN 3.1
Video encoder			—N/a	VCE 1.0		VCE 2.0		VCE 3.1		VCN 1.0		VCN 2.1	VCN 2.2	VCN 3.1		?	—N/a	VCE 2.0			VCE 3.4	VCN 1.0			VCN 3.1
AMD Fluid Motion			No			Yes				No							No		Yes			No			
GPU power saving			PowerPlay	PowerTune													PowerPlay	PowerTune							
TrueAudio			—N/a			Yes							?				—N/a	Yes							
FreeSync			—N/a			1; 2											—N/a	1; 2							
HDCP (Note: To play protected video content, it also requires card, operating system, driver, and application support. A compatible HDCP display is also needed for this. HDCP is mandatory for the output of certain audio formats, placing additional constraints on the multimedia setup.)			?			1.4				2.2				2.3			?	1.4				2.2			2.3
PlayReady			—N/a							3.0 not yet							—N/a					3.0 not yet			
Supported displays (Note: To feed more than two displays, the additional panels must have native DisplayPort support. Alternatively active DisplayPort-to-DVI/HDMI/VGA adapters can be employed.)			2–3	2–4				3		3 (desktop); 4 (mobile, embedded)		4					2				3	4		4	
/drm/radeon (Note: DRM (Direct Rendering Manager) is a component of the Linux kernel. Support in this table refers to the most current version.)			Yes						—N/a								Yes				—N/a				
/drm/amdgpu			—N/a			Yes											—N/a	Yes							

==== GPUs ====
The following table shows features of AMD/ATI's GPUs (see also: List of AMD graphics processing units).

Name of GPU series	Wonder	Mach	3D Rage	Rage Pro	Rage 128	R100	R200	R300	R400	R500	R600	RV670	R700	Evergreen	Northern Islands		Southern Islands	Sea Islands	Volcanic Islands	Arctic Islands/Polaris	Vega	Navi 1x	Navi 2x	Navi 3x	Navi 4x
Released	1986	1991	Apr; 1996	Mar; 1997	Aug; 1998	Apr; 2000	Aug; 2001	Sep; 2002	May; 2004	Oct; 2005	May; 2007	Nov; 2007	Jun; 2008	Sep; 2009	Oct; 2010	Dec; 2010	Jan; 2012	Sep; 2013	Jun; 2015	Jun 2016, Apr 2017, Aug 2019	Jun 2017, Feb 2019	Jul; 2019	Nov; 2020	Dec; 2022	Feb; 2025
Marketing Name	Wonder	Mach	3D; Rage	Rage; Pro	Rage; 128	Radeon; 7000	Radeon; 8000	Radeon; 9000	Radeon; X700/X800	Radeon; X1000	Radeon; HD 2000	Radeon; HD 3000	Radeon; HD 4000	Radeon; HD 5000	Radeon; HD 6000		Radeon; HD 7000	Radeon; 200	Radeon; 300	Radeon; 400/500/600	Radeon; RX Vega, Radeon VII	Radeon; RX 5000	Radeon; RX 6000	Radeon; RX 7000	Radeon; RX 9000
AMD support	Ended																			Current					
Kind	2D		3D																						
Instruction set architecture	Not publicly known										TeraScale instruction set						GCN instruction set					RDNA instruction set			
Microarchitecture	Not publicly known					GFX1		GFX2			TeraScale 1 (VLIW5) (GFX3)			TeraScale 2 (VLIW5) (GFX4)	TeraScale 2 (VLIW5) up to 68xx (GFX4)	TeraScale 3 (VLIW4) in 69xx (GFX5)	GCN 1st gen (GFX6)	GCN 2nd gen (GFX7)	GCN 3rd gen (GFX8)	GCN 4th gen (GFX8)	GCN 5th gen (GFX9)	RDNA (GFX10.1)	RDNA 2 (GFX10.3)	RDNA 3 (GFX11)	RDNA 4 (GFX12)
Type	Fixed pipeline (Note: The Radeon R100 Series has programmable pixel shaders, but do not fully comply with DirectX 8 or Pixel Shader 1.0. See article on R100's pixel shaders.)						Programmable pixel & vertex pipelines				Unified shader model														
Direct3D	—N/a		5.0	6.0		7.0	8.1	9.0; 11 (9_2)	9.0b 11 (9_2)	9.0c 11 (9_3)	10.0; 11 (10_0)	10.1; 11 (10_1)		11 (11_0)			11 (11_1); 12 (11_1)	11 (12_0); 12 (12_0)			11 (12_1); 12 (12_1)		11 (12_1); 12 (12_2)		
Shader model	—N/a						1.4	2.0+	2.0b	3.0	4.0	4.1		5.0			5.1	5.1; 6.5			6.7				6.8
OpenGL	—N/a			1.1	1.2	1.3		1.5 (Note: R300, R400 and R500 based cards do not fully comply with OpenGL 2+ as the hardware does not support all types of non-power of two (NPOT) textures.)			3.3			4.5 (Windows), 4.6 (Linux Mesa 25.2+)			4.6 (Note: OpenGL 4+ compliance requires supporting FP64 shaders and these are emulated on some TeraScale chips using 32-bit hardware.)								
Vulkan	—N/a															1.1 (Note: Vulkan support is theoretically possible but has not been implemented in a stable driver.)	1.3 (Note: Vulkan support in Linux relies on the AMDgpu kernel driver, the radeon driver does not support Vulkan.)		1.4						
OpenCL	—N/a										Close to Metal		1.1 (not supported by Mesa)	1.2+ (on Linux: 1.1+ (no Image support on Clover, with Rusticl) with Mesa, 1.2+ on GCN 1.Gen)				2.0+ (Adrenalin driver on Win 7+) (on Linux ROCm, Mesa 1.2+ (no support in Clover, only Rusticl, Mesa, 2.0+ and 3.0 with AMD drivers or AMD ROCm), 5th gen: 2.2 win 10+ and Linux RocM 5.0+				2.2+ and 3.0 Windows 8.1+ and Linux ROCm 5.0+ (Mesa Rusticl 1.2+ and 3.0 (2.1+ and 2.2+))			
HSA / ROCm	—N/a																Yes					?			
Video decoding ASIC	—N/a										Avivo/UVD	UVD+	UVD 2	UVD 2.2	UVD 3		UVD 4	UVD 4.2	UVD 5.0 or 6.0	UVD 6.3	UVD 7 (Note: The UVD and VCE were replaced by the Video Core Next (VCN) ASIC in the Raven Ridge APU implementation of Vega.)	VCN 2.0	VCN 3.0	VCN 4.0	VCN 5.0
Video encoding ASIC	—N/a																VCE 1.0	VCE 2.0	VCE 3.0 or 3.1	VCE 3.4	VCE 4.0	VCN 2.0	VCN 3.0	VCN 4.0	VCN 5.0
Fluid Motion (Note: Video processing for video frame rate interpolation technique. In Windows it works as a DirectShow filter in your player. In Linux, there is no support on the part of drivers and / or community.)	No																	Yes				No		?	
Power saving	?										PowerPlay				PowerTune		PowerTune & ZeroCore Power					?			
TrueAudio	—N/a																	Via dedicated DSP		Via shaders					
FreeSync	—N/a																	1; 2							
HDCP (Note: To play protected video content, it also requires card, operating system, driver, and application support. A compatible HDCP display is also needed for this. HDCP is mandatory for the output of certain audio formats, placing additional constraints on the multimedia setup.)	—N/a										?							1.4		2.2		2.3			
PlayReady	—N/a																			3.0	No	3.0			
Supported displays (Note: More displays may be supported with native DisplayPort connections, or splitting the maximum resolution between multiple monitors with active converters.)						1–2	2							2–6								?			4
Max. resolution	?													2–6 × 2560×1600			2–6 × 4096×2160 @ 30 Hz			2–6 × 5120×2880 @ 60 Hz	3 × 7680×4320 @ 60 Hz	7680×4320 @ 60 Hz PowerColor		7680x4320 @165 Hz	7680x4320
/drm/radeon (Note: DRM (Direct Rendering Manager) is a component of the Linux kernel. AMDgpu is the Linux kernel module. Support in this table refers to the most current version.)						Yes													—N/a						
/drm/amdgpu	—N/a																Yes Kernel 6.19+		Yes						

== Operating system support ==
The VCE SIP core needs to be supported by the device driver. The device driver provides one or multiple interfaces, e. g. OpenMAX IL. One of these interfaces is then used by end-user software, like GStreamer or HandBrake (HandBrake rejected VCE support in December 2016, but added it in December 2018), to access the VCE hardware and make use of it.

AMD's proprietary device driver AMD Catalyst is available for multiple operating systems and support for VCE was added to it. Additionally, a free device driver is available. This driver also supports the VCE hardware.

=== Linux ===
Support for the VCE ASIC is contained in the Linux kernel device driver amdgpu.

- Initial VCE support was added on 4 February 2014 by Christian König of AMD to the free radeon driver.
- Gallium3D state tracker for OpenMAX was added 24 October 2013 to Mesa 3D.
- The free and open-source Radeon driver was adapted to use OpenMAX with the GStreamer OpenMAX (gst-omx) support for exposing the VCE video encode engine.
- AMD employee Leo Liu implemented h264 level support into the Mesa 3D state tracker.

=== Windows ===
The software "MediaShow Espresso Video Transcoding" seems to utilize VCE and UVD to the fullest extent possible.

XSplit Broadcaster supports VCE from version 1.3.

Open Broadcaster Software (OBS Studio) supports VCE for recording and streaming. The original Open Broadcaster Software (OBS) requires a fork build in order to enable VCE.

AMD Radeon Software supports VCE with built in game capture ("Radeon ReLive") and use AMD AMF/VCE on APU or Radeon Graphics card to reduce FPS drop when capturing game or video content.

HandBrake added Video Coding Engine support in version 1.2.0 in December 2018.

== Successor ==
The VCE was succeeded by AMD Video Core Next in the Raven Ridge series of APUs released in October 2017. The VCN combines both encode (VCE) and decode (UVD).

== See also ==
=== Video hardware technologies ===
==== AMD ====
- Video Core Next - AMD
- Video Coding Engine - AMD
- Unified Video Decoder - AMD
- Video Shader - ATI

==== Others ====
- Intel Quick Sync Video – Intel's equivalent SIP core
- Nvidia NVENC – Nvidia's equivalent SIP core
- Qualcomm Hexagon - Qualcomm's equivalent SIP core
