= 7870 =

7870 may refer to:

- Exynos 7 Octa 7870, a system on chip released in 2016
- Radeon HD 7870, graphics chipset released in 2012
