= Radeon HD 7000 series =

Series of video cards

AMD Radeon HD 7000 series
- Release date: January 9, 2012; 14 years ago
- Codename: Southern Islands; London; Trinity; Sea Islands
- Architecture: TeraScale 2 TeraScale 3 GCN 1st gen GCN 2nd gen
- Transistors: 292M 40 nm (Cedar); 370M 40 nm (Caicos); 716M 40 nm (Turks); 1.500M 28 nm (Cape Verde); 2.080M 28 nm (Bonaire); 2.800M 28 nm (Pitcairn); 4.313M 28 nm (Tahiti); 2x 4.313M 28 nm (New Zealand)

Cards
- Entry-level: 7350; 7450; 7470; 7510; 7570; 7670; 7730
- Mid-range: 7750; 7770; 7790; 7850
- High-end: 7870; 7870 XT; 7950; 7970
- Enthusiast: 7990

API support
- Direct3D: Direct3D 12.0 (feature level 11_1) (GCN version); Shader Model 6.5 (GCN) or Shader Model 5.0
- OpenCL: OpenCL 2.1 (GCN version)
- OpenGL: OpenGL 4.5; OpenGL 4.6 (GCN only, Windows 7+ and Adrenalin 18.4.1+, Linux)
- Vulkan: Vulkan 1.2 (GCN, Windows), Vulkan 1.3 (GCN, Linux), or none (TeraScale); SPIR-V

History
- Predecessor: Radeon HD 6000 series
- Variant: Radeon HD 8000 series
- Successor: Radeon R5/R7/R9 200 series

Support status
- Unsupported

The Radeon HD 7000 series, codenamed "Southern Islands", is a family of GPUs developed by AMD, and manufactured on TSMC's 28 nm process.

The primary competitor of Southern Islands was Nvidia's GeForce 600 series (also manufactured at TSMC), which shipped during Q1 2012, largely due to the immaturity of the 28 nm process.

== Architecture ==
Graphics Core Next was introduced with the Radeon HD 7000 series.

- A GPU implementing Graphics Core Next is found on the Radeon HD 7730 and above branded discrete GPUs.
- A GPU implementing TeraScale (microarchitecture) version "Evergreen (VLIW5)" is found on Radeon HD 7670 and below branded discrete GPUs.
- A GPU implementing TeraScale (microarchitecture) version "Northern Islands (VLIW4)" is found on APUs whose GPUs are branded with the Radeon HD 7000 series.
- OpenGL 4.x compliance requires supporting FP64 shaders. These are implemented by emulation on some TeraScale (microarchitecture) GPUs.
- On Windows, Vulkan 1.0 requires GCN-Architecture. Vulkan 1.1 requires actual 2nd Gen. of GCN or higher (here only HD 7790). On newer AMD drivers Vulkan 1.1 on Windows and Linux is supported on all GCN-architecture based GPUs. With the RADV driver, Vulkan 1.3 is supported on GCN GPUs.

=== Multi-monitor support ===
The AMD Eyefinity-branded on-die display controllers were introduced in September 2009 in the Radeon HD 5000 series and have been present in all products since.

=== Video acceleration ===
Both Unified Video Decoder (UVD) and Video Coding Engine (VCE) are present on the dies of all products and supported by AMD Catalyst and by the free and open-source graphics device driver#ATI/AMD.

=== OpenCL (API) ===
OpenCL accelerates many scientific Software Packages against CPU up to factor 10 or 100 and more. Open CL 1.0 to 1.2 are supported for all Chips with Terascale and GCN Architecture. OpenCL 2.0 is supported with GCN 2nd Gen. or 1.2 and higher. For OpenCL 2.1 and 2.2 only Driver Updates are necessary with OpenCL 2.0 conformant Cards.

=== Vulkan (API) ===
Vulkan 1.1 is supported for all with GCN Architecture using recent drivers on both Linux and Windows. Vulkan 1.2 is available for GCN 2nd Gen or higher with Windows Adrenalin 20.1(and newer). Vulkan 1.3 is available for GCN 1st Gen and higher with Mesa RADV on Linux.

== Desktop products ==
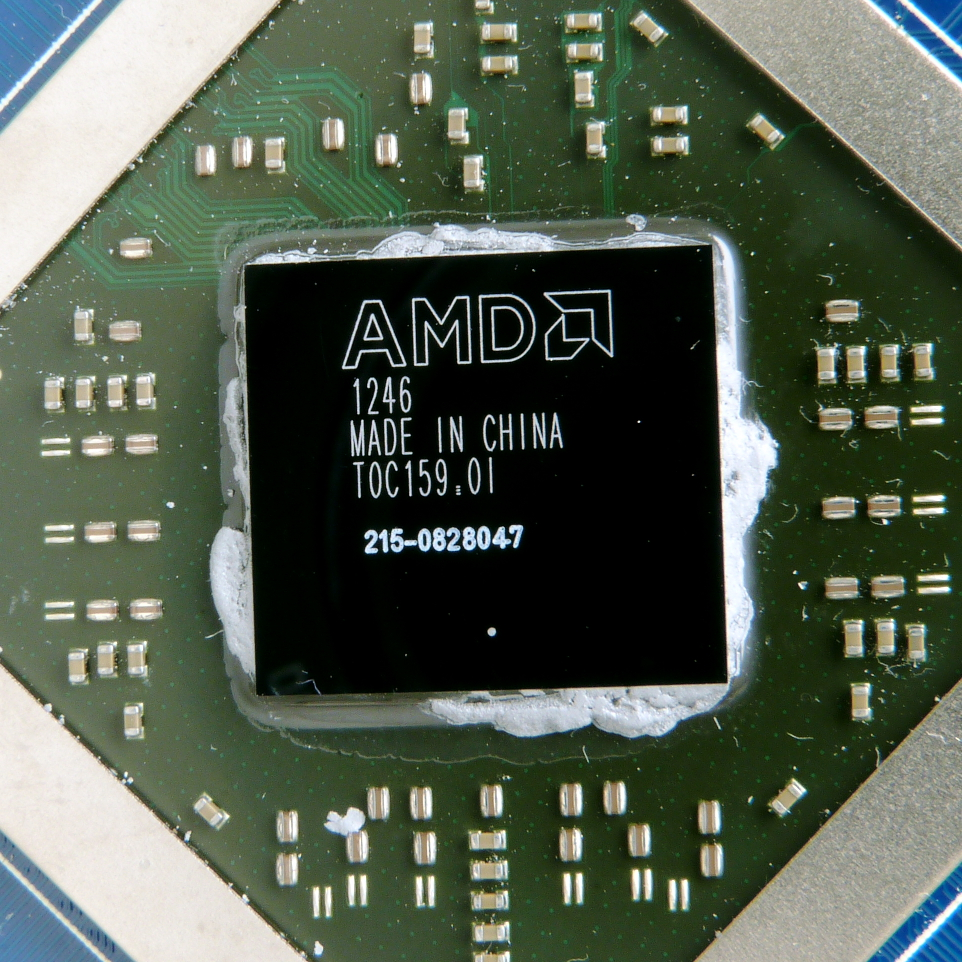
Die and package of a Radeon HD 7870 graphics card

The 28 nm product line is divided in three dies (Tahiti, Pitcairn, and Cape Verde), each one highly increasing shader units (32, 20 and 10 respectively). While this gives a high increase in single-precision floating point, there is however a significant departure in double-precision compute power. Tahiti has a maximum ¼ double precision throughput relative to its single precision throughput, while the other two smaller consumer dies can only achieve a 1/16 ratio. While each bigger die has two additional memory controllers widening its bus by 128 bits, Pitcairn however has the same front-end dual tesselator units as Tahiti giving it similar performance to its larger brethren in DX11 tessellation benchmarks.

=== Radeon HD 7900 ===
Codenamed Tahiti, the Radeon HD 7900 series was announced on December 22, 2011. Products include the Radeon 7970 GHz Edition, Radeon HD 7970 and Radeon HD 7950. The Radeon HD 7970 features 2048 usable stream cores, (Note: Corresponding to 32 cores in "the closest reasonable mapping to the equivalent in a CPU".) whereas the Radeon HD 7950 has 1792 usable stream cores, as 256 out of the 2048 cores are disabled during product binning which detects defective areas of a chip. The cards are the first products to take advantage of AMD's new "Graphics Core Next" compute architecture. Both cards are equipped with 3 GB GDDR5 memory and manufactured on TSMC's 28 nm process. The Tahiti GPU is also used in the Radeon HD 7870 XT, released November 19, 2012. In this case one quarter of the stream processors are disabled, giving 1536 usable cores. Additionally, the memory interface is downgraded from 384-bit to 256-bit, along with a memory size reduction from 3 GB to 2 GB.

=== Radeon HD 7800 ===
Codenamed Pitcairn, the Radeon HD 7800 series was formally unveiled on March 5, 2012, with retail availability from March 19, 2012. Products include the Radeon HD 7870 and Radeon HD 7850. The Radeon HD 7870 features 1280 usable stream cores, whereas the Radeon HD 7850 has 1024 usable stream cores. Both cards are equipped with 2GB GDDR5 memory (some 7850s offer 1GB) and manufactured on TSMC's 28 nm process.

=== Radeon HD 7700 ===
Codenamed Cape Verde, the Radeon HD 7700 series was released on February 15, 2012. Products include the Radeon HD 7770 GHz Edition and Radeon HD 7750. The Radeon HD 7770 GHz Edition features 640 stream cores based on the GCN architecture, whereas the Radeon HD 7750 has only 512 usable stream cores. Both cards are equipped with 1 GB GDDR5 memory and manufactured in 28 nm. On March 22, 2013, another card, Radeon HD 7790, was introduced in this series. This card is based on the Bonaire architecture, which features 896 stream cores using 2nd Generation GCN technology, an incremental update. In May 2013, AMD launched the Radeon HD 7730, based on the Cape Verde LE graphics processor. It features a 128-bit memory bus, 384 stream cores, 8 ROPs, and a core clock speed of up to 800 MHz. The HD 7730 came with GDDR5 and DDR3 variants, running on memory clock speeds of 1125 MHz and 900 MHz, respectively. Load power usage was lowered by 14.5% (47W) compared to the Radeon HD 7750 (55W).

== Chipset table ==
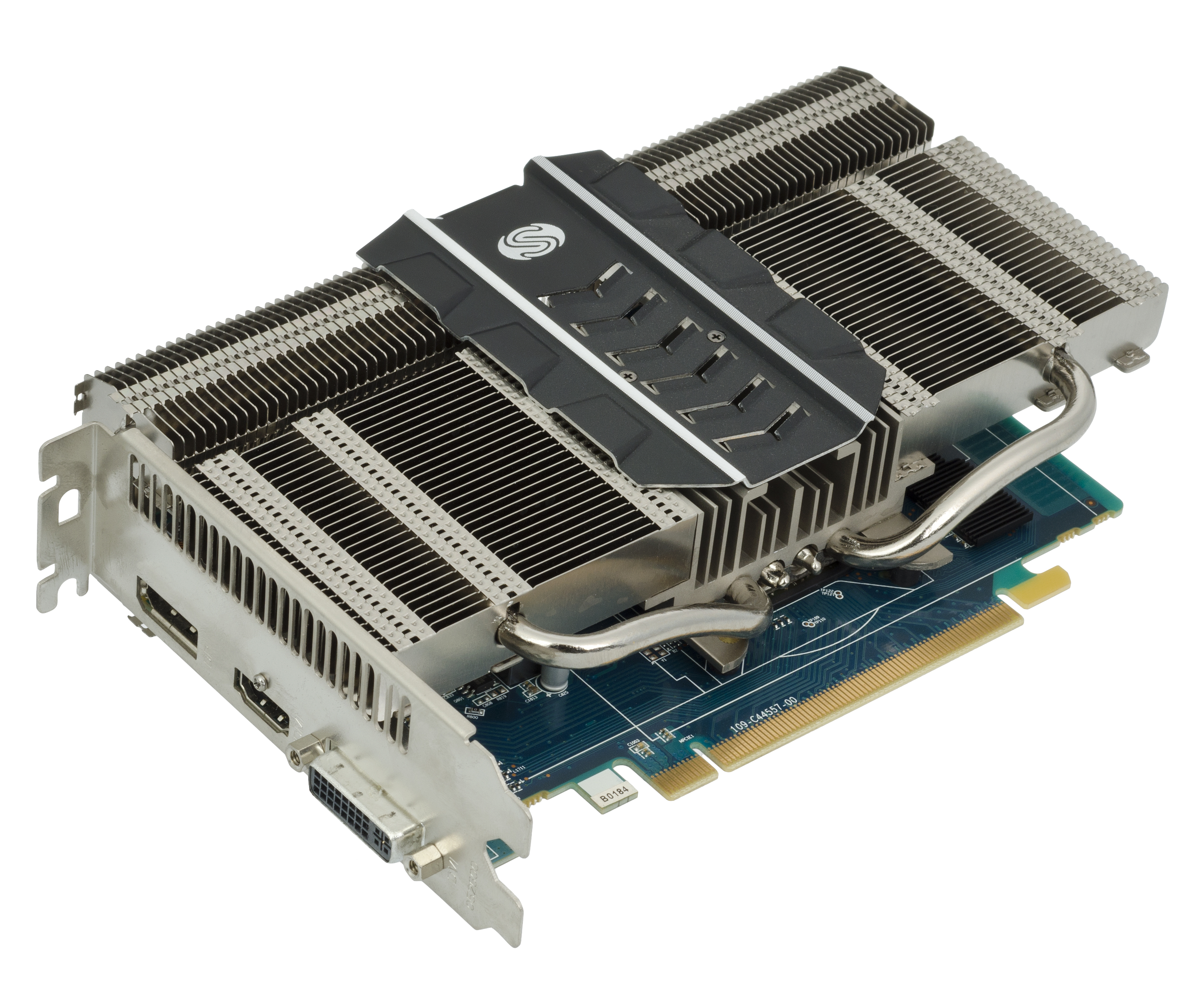
Radeon HD 7750 card using a fanless design

=== Desktop products ===
- HD 7790 model is designed more like the 7800–7900 models rather than the 7700 featuring 2x primitive rate instead of 1x which is found in the other 7700 cards.
- Bonaire XT is the only card in the 7000 series to support True Audio.

Model (Codename)	Launch	Architecture Fab	Transistors Die Size	Core		Fillrate (Note: Boost values (if available) are stated below the base value in italic.) (Note: Texture fillrate is calculated as the number of Texture Mapping Units multiplied by the base (or boost) core clock speed.) (Note: Pixel fillrate is calculated as the number of Render Output Units multiplied by the base (or boost) core clock speed.)		Processing power (Note: Precision performance is calculated from the base (or boost) core clock speed based on a FMA operation.) (GFLOPS)		Memory (Note: The effective data transfer rate of GDDR5 is quadruple its nominal clock, instead of double as it is with DDR memory.)				TDP (Watts)		Bus interface	Release Price (USD)
Model (Codename)	Launch	Architecture Fab	Transistors Die Size	Config (Note: Unified Shaders : Texture Mapping Units : Render Output Units)	Clock (MHz)	Texture (GT/s)	Pixel (GP/s)	Single	Double	Size (MiB)	Bus type & width	Clock (MHz)	Bandwidth (GB/s)	Idle	Max.	Bus interface	Release Price (USD)
Radeon HD 7350 (Cedar)	January 2012	TeraScale 2 (Note: Lacks hardware video encoder); 40 nm	292×10^{6} 59 mm^{2}	80:8:4	400; 650	3.2; 5.2	1.6; 2.6	104	—N/a	256; 512	DDR2; DDR3; 64-bit	400; 800; 900	6.4; 12.8; 14.4	6.4	19.1	PCIe 2.1 ×16	OEM
Radeon HD 7450 (Caicos)	January 2012	TeraScale 2; 40 nm	370×10^{6} 67 mm^{2}	160:8:4	625; 750	5.0; 6.0	2.5; 3.0	200; 240	—N/a	512; 1024	DDR3; 64-bit	533; 800	8.5; 12.8	9	18	PCIe 2.1 ×16	OEM
Radeon HD 7470 (Caicos)	January 2012	TeraScale 2; 40 nm	370×10^{6} 67 mm^{2}	160:8:4	625; 775	5.0; 6.2	2.5; 3.1	200; 248	—N/a	512; 1024	DDR3; GDDR5; 64-bit	800; 900	12.8; 28.8	9	27	PCIe 2.1 ×16	OEM
Radeon HD 7510 (Turks LE)	February 2013	TeraScale 2; 40 nm	716×10^{6} 118 mm^{2}	320:16:4	650	10.4	2.6	416	—N/a	1024	DDR3; 128-bit	667	21.3	Unknown	Unknown	PCIe 2.1 ×16	OEM
Radeon HD 7570 (Turks Pro-L)	January 2012	TeraScale 2; 40 nm	716×10^{6} 118 mm^{2}	480:24:8	650	15.6	5.2	624	—N/a	512; 1024	DDR3; GDDR5; 128-bit	900; 1000	28.8; 64	10; 11	44; 60	PCIe 2.1 ×16	OEM
Radeon HD 7670 (Turks XT)	January 2012	TeraScale 2; 40 nm	716×10^{6} 118 mm^{2}	480:24:8	800	19.2	6.4	768	—N/a	512; 1024	GDDR5; 128-bit	1000	64	12	66	PCIe 2.1 ×16	OEM
Radeon HD 7730 (Cape Verde LE)	April 2013	GCN 1^{st} gen 28 nm	1500×10^{6} 123 mm^{2}	384:24:8	800	19.2	6.4	614.4	38.4	1024	DDR3; GDDR5; 128-bit	1125	25.6; 72	10	47	PCIe 3.0 ×16	$60
Radeon HD 7750 (Cape Verde Pro)	February 2012	GCN 1^{st} gen 28 nm	1500×10^{6} 123 mm^{2}	512:32:16	800; 900	25.6; 28.8	12.8; 14.4	819.2; 921.6	51.2; 57.6	1024; 2048; 4096	DDR3; GDDR5; 128-bit	800; 1125	25.6; 72	10	55	PCIe 3.0 ×16	$110
Radeon HD 7770 GHz Edition (Cape Verde XT)	February 2012	GCN 1^{st} gen 28 nm	1500×10^{6} 123 mm^{2}	640:40:16	1000	40	16	1280	80	1024; 2048	GDDR5; 128-bit	1125	72	10	80	PCIe 3.0 ×16	$160
Radeon HD 7790 (Bonaire XT)	March 2013	GCN 2^{nd} gen 28 nm	2080×10^{6} 160 mm^{2}	896:56:16	1000	56.0	16.0	1792	128	1024; 2048	GDDR5; 128-bit	1500	96	10	85	PCIe 3.0 ×16	$150
Radeon HD 7850 (Pitcairn Pro)	March 2012	GCN 1^{st} gen 28 nm	2800×10^{6} 212 mm^{2}	1024:64:32	860	55.04	27.52	1761.28	110.08	1024; 2048	GDDR5; 256-bit	1200	153.6	10	130	PCIe 3.0 ×16	$250
Radeon HD 7870 GHz Edition (Pitcairn XT)	March 2012	GCN 1^{st} gen 28 nm	2800×10^{6} 212 mm^{2}	1280:80:32	1000	80	32	2560	160	2048	GDDR5; 256-bit	1200	153.6	10	175	PCIe 3.0 ×16	$350
Radeon HD 7870 XT (Tahiti LE)	November 2012	GCN 1^{st} gen 28 nm	4313×10^{6} 352 mm^{2}	1536:96:32	925; 975	88.8	29.6	2841.6; 2995.2	710.4; 748.8	2048	GDDR5; 256-bit	1500	192.0	15	185	PCIe 3.0 ×16	$270
Radeon HD 7950 (Tahiti Pro)	January 2012	GCN 1^{st} gen 28 nm	4313×10^{6} 352 mm^{2}	1792:112:32	800	89.6	25.6	2867.2	717	3072	GDDR5; 384-bit	1250	240	15	200	PCIe 3.0 ×16	$450
Radeon HD 7950 Boost (Tahiti Pro2)	August 2012	GCN 1^{st} gen 28 nm	4313×10^{6} 352 mm^{2}	1792:112:32	850; 925	103.6	29.6	3046.4; 3315.2	761.6; 828.8	3072	GDDR5; 384-bit	1250	240	15	225	PCIe 3.0 ×16	$330
Radeon HD 7970 (Tahiti XT)	December 2011	GCN 1^{st} gen 28 nm	4313×10^{6} 352 mm^{2}	2048:128:32	925	118.4	29.6	3788.8	947.2	3072; 6144	GDDR5; 384-bit	1375	264	15	250	PCIe 3.0 ×16	$550
Radeon HD 7970 GHz Edition (Tahiti XT2)	June 2012	GCN 1^{st} gen 28 nm	4313×10^{6} 352 mm^{2}	2048:128:32	1000; 1050	128.0	32	4096; 4300.8	1024; 1075	3072; 6144	GDDR5; 384-bit	1500	288	15	250	PCIe 3.0 ×16	$500
Radeon HD 7990 (New Zealand)	April 2013	GCN 1^{st} gen 28 nm	2× 4313×10^{6} 352 mm^{2}	2× 2048:128:32	950; 1000	2× 128	2× 32	7782.4; 8192	1945.6; 2048	2× 3072	GDDR5; 384-bit	1500	2× 288	15	375	PCIe 3.0 ×16	$1000
Model (Codename)	Launch	Architecture Fab	Transistors Die Size	Config	Clock (MHz)	Texture (GT/s)	Pixel (GP/s)	Single	Double	Size (MiB)	Bus type & width	Clock (MHz)	Bandwidth (GB/s)	Idle	Max.	Bus interface	Release Price (USD)
Model (Codename)	Launch	Architecture Fab	Transistors Die Size	Core		Fillrate		Processing power (GFLOPS)		Memory				TDP (Watts)		Bus interface	Release Price (USD)

=== IGP (HD 7xxx) ===
- All models feature the UNB/MC Bus interface
- All models do not feature double-precision FP
- All models feature angle independent anisotropic filtering, UVD3.2, and Eyefinity capabilities, with up to four outputs.
- All models are based on the TeraScale 3 (VLIW4) used in the Radeon HD 69xx Series (Cayman) GPUs.

Model	Launch	Code name	Architecture	Fab (nm)	Core Clock (MHz)		Config core (Note: Unified Shaders : Texture Mapping Units : Render Output Units)	Fillrate		Shared Memory			Processing power (GFLOPS)	API compliance (version)			TDP (W) (Note: TDP specified for AMD reference designs, includes CPU power consumption. Actual TDP of retail products may vary.)	APU
Model	Launch	Code name	Architecture	Fab (nm)	Base	Turbo	Config core	Texture (GT/s)	Pixel (GP/s)	Bus width (bit)	Bus type	Bandwidth (GB/s)	Processing power (GFLOPS)	Direct3D	OpenGL (Note: OpenGL 4.5 possible for Terascale 3 with AMD Radeon Software Crimson Beta (driver 15.30 or higher).)	OpenCL	TDP (W)	APU
Radeon HD 7310	June 6, 2012	Ontario	TeraScale 2 (Note: Lacks hardware video encoder)	40	500	—N/a	80:8:4	4.00	2.00	64	DDR3-1066	8.53	80	11.3 (11_0)	4.5	1.2	18	E2-1200
Radeon HD 7340	June 6, 2012	Ontario	TeraScale 2	40	523	680	80:8:4	5.44	2.72	64	DDR3-1333	10.66	83.6–108.8	11.3 (11_0)	4.5	1.2	18	E2-1800
Radeon HD 7480D	June 1, 2012	Scrapper	TeraScale 3	32	723	—N/a	128:8:4	11.6	2.9	128	DDR3-1600	25.6	185	11.3 (11_0)	4.5	1.2	65	A4-4000, A4-5300
Radeon HD 7540D	June 1, 2012	Scrapper	TeraScale 3	32	760	—N/a	192:12:4	Unknown		128	DDR3-1866	29.9	292	11.3 (11_0)	4.5	1.2	65	A6-5400K
Radeon HD 7560D	June 1, 2012	Devastator	TeraScale 3	32	760	—N/a	256:16:4	Unknown		128	DDR3-1866	29.9	389	11.3 (11_0)	4.5	1.2	65–100	A8-5500, A8-5600K
Radeon HD 7660D	June 1, 2012	Devastator	TeraScale 3	32	760	800	384:24:8	16.2	2.7	128	DDR3-1866	29.9	584–614	11.3 (11_0)	4.5	1.2	65–100	A10-5700 (760 MHz), A10-5800K (800 MHz)

=== Mobile products ===
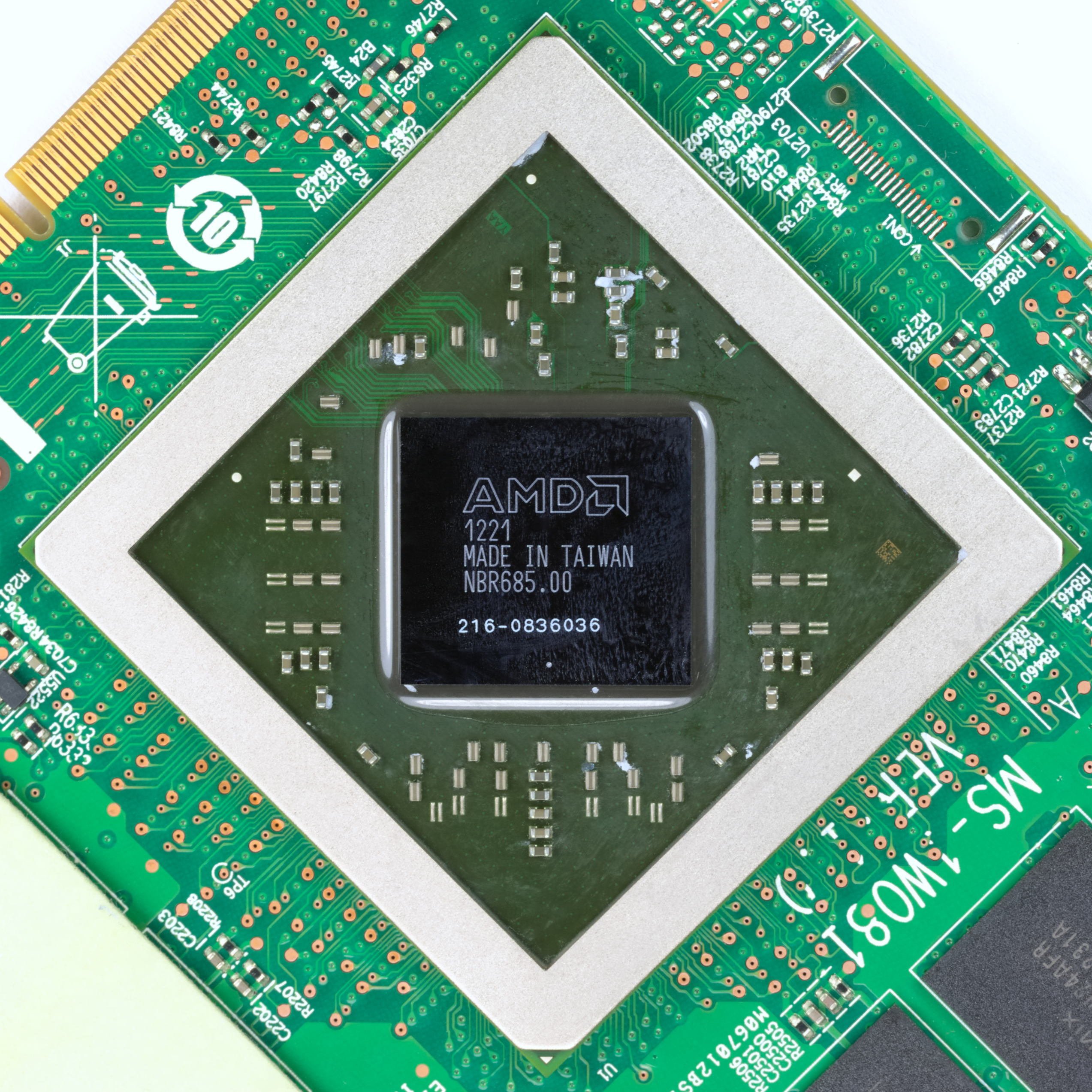
A Radeon HD 7970M GPU on a Mobile PCI Express Module

Model (Codename)	Launch	Architecture (Fab)	Core		Fillrate		Processing power (GFLOPS)	Memory				Bus interface	TDP (W)
Model (Codename)	Launch	Architecture (Fab)	Config (Note: Unified Shaders : Texture Mapping Units : Render Output Units)	Clock (MHz)	Texture (GT/s)	Pixel (GP/s)	Processing power (GFLOPS)	Size (GiB)	Bus type & width (bit) (Note: The effective data transfer rate of GDDR5 is quadruple its nominal clock, instead of double as it is with other DDR memory.)	Memory (MHz)	Bandwidth (GB/s)	Bus interface	TDP (W)
Radeon HD 7430M (Seymour Pro)	January 2012	TeraScale 2 (Note: Lacks hardware video encoder) (40 nm)	160:8:4:2	600	4.8	2.4	192	1	DDR3; 64-bit	900	14.4	PCIe 2.1 ×16	7
Radeon HD 7450M (Seymour Pro)	January 2012	TeraScale 2 (40 nm)	160:8:4:2	700; 700	5.6	2.8	224	1	DDR3; GDDR5; 64-bit	900; 800	14.4; 25.6	PCIe 2.1 ×16	7
Radeon HD 7470M (Seymour XT)	January 2012	TeraScale 2 (40 nm)	160:8:4:2	750; 800	6; 6.4	3.0; 3.2	240; 256	1	DDR3; GDDR5; 64-bit	900; 800	14.4; 25.6	PCIe 2.1 ×16	7~9
Radeon HD 7490M (Seymour XTX)	January 2012	TeraScale 2 (40 nm)	160:8:4:2	800	6.4	3.2	256	1	GDDR5; 64-bit	950	30.4	PCIe 2.1 ×16	9
Radeon HD 7510M (Thames LE)	January 2012	TeraScale 2 (40 nm)	400:20:8:5	450	9.0	3.6	360	1	DDR3; 64-bit	800	12.8	PCIe 2.1 ×16	11
Radeon HD 7530M (Thames LP)	January 2012	TeraScale 2 (40 nm)	400:24:8:5	450	9.0	3.6	360	1	DDR3; 64-bit	900	14.4	PCIe 2.1 ×16	11
Radeon HD 7550M (Thames Pro)	January 2012	TeraScale 2 (40 nm)	400:20:8:5	450; 550	9.0; 11.0	3.6; 4.4	360; 440	1	DDR3; GDDR5; 64-bit	900; 800	14.4; 25.6	PCIe 2.1 ×16	13
Radeon HD 7570M (Thames Pro)	January 2012	TeraScale 2 (40 nm)	400:20:8:5	450; 650	9.0; 13.0	3.6; 5.2	360; 520	1	DDR3; GDDR5; 64-bit	900; 800	14.4; 25.6	PCIe 2.1 ×16	13~15
Radeon HD 7590M (Thames XT)	January 2012	TeraScale 2 (40 nm)	480:24:8:6	600	14.4	4.8	576	1	GDDR5; 64-bit	800	25.6	PCIe 2.1 ×16	18
Radeon HD 7610M (Thames LE)	January 2012	TeraScale 2 (40 nm)	400:20:8:5	450	9.0	3.6	360	1	DDR3; 128-bit	800	25.6	PCIe 2.1 ×16	20
Radeon HD 7630M (Thames LP)	January 2012	TeraScale 2 (40 nm)	480:24:8:6	450	10.8	3.6	432	1	DDR3; 128-bit	800	25.6	PCIe 2.1 ×16	20~25
Radeon HD 7650M (Thames Pro)	January 2012	TeraScale 2 (40 nm)	480:24:8:6	450; 550	10.8; 13.2	3.6; 4.4	432; 528	1	DDR3; 128-bit	800; 800	25.6	PCIe 2.1 ×16	20~25
Radeon HD 7670M (Thames Pro)	January 2012	TeraScale 2 (40 nm)	480:24:8:6	600	14.4	4.8	576	1	DDR3; GDDR5; 128-bit	900	28.8; 57.6	PCIe 2.1 ×16	20~25
Radeon HD 7690M (Thames XT)	January 2012	TeraScale 2 (40 nm)	480:24:8:6	725; 600	17.4; 14.4	5.8; 4.8	696; 576	1; 2	DDR3; GDDR5; 128-bit	900; 900	28.8; 57.6	PCIe 2.1 ×16	20~25
Radeon HD 7690M XT (Thames XTX)	January 2012	TeraScale 2 (40 nm)	480:24:8:6	725	17.4	5.8	696	1; 2	GDDR5; 128-bit	900	57.6	PCIe 2.1 ×16	25
Radeon HD 7730M (Chelsea LP)	April 2012	GCN 1^{st} gen (28 nm)	512:32:16:8	575; 675	18.4; 21.6	9.2; 10.8	588.8; 691.2	2	GDDR3; 128-bit	900; 900	28.8	PCIe 2.1 ×16	25~28
Radeon HD 7750M (Chelsea Pro)	April 2012	GCN 1^{st} gen (28 nm)	512:32:16:8	575	18.4	9.2	588.8	1; 2	GDDR5; 128-bit	1000	64	PCIe 2.1 ×16	28
Radeon HD 7770M (Chelsea XT)	April 2012	GCN 1^{st} gen (28 nm)	512:32:16:8	675	21.6	10.8	691.2	1; 2	GDDR5; 128-bit	1000	64	PCIe 2.1 ×16	32
Radeon HD 7850M (Heathrow Pro)	April 2012	GCN 1^{st} gen (28 nm)	640:40:16:10	675	27	10.8	864	2	GDDR5; 128-bit	1000	64	PCIe 3.0 ×16	40
Radeon HD 7870M (Heathrow XT)	April 2012	GCN 1^{st} gen (28 nm)	640:40:16:10	800	32	12.8	1024	2	GDDR5; 128-bit	1000	64	PCIe 3.0 ×16	40–45
Radeon HD 7970M (Wimbledon XT)	April 2012	GCN 1^{st} gen (28 nm)	1280:80:32:20	850	68	27.2	2176	2; 4	GDDR5; 256-bit	1200	153.6	PCIe 3.0 ×16	75

=== Integrated (IGP) products ===
Model (Codename)	Launch	Architecture (Fab)	Core config (Note: Unified Shaders : Texture Mapping Units : Render Output Units)	Clock rate (MHz)		Fillrate		Processing power (GFLOPS)	Shared memory		
Model (Codename)	Launch	Architecture (Fab)	Core config	Core (MHz)	Boost (MHz)	Pixel (GP/s)	Texture (GT/s)	Processing power (GFLOPS)	Bus type & width (bit)	Clock	Bandwidth (GB/s)
Radeon HD 7400G (Scrapper)	September 2012	TeraScale 3 (Note: Lacks hardware video encoder) (32 nm)	192:12:4	327	424	1.31	3.92	125.57	DDR3; 128-bit	1333 to 2133	21.33–34.13
Radeon HD 7420G (Scrapper)	June 2012	TeraScale 3 (32 nm)	128:8:4	480	655	1.92	3.84	122.88	DDR3; 128-bit	1333 to 2133	21.33–34.13
Radeon HD 7500G (Scrapper)	May 2012	TeraScale 3 (32 nm)	256:16:8	327	424	2.62	5.23	167.42	DDR3; 128-bit	1333 to 2133	21.33–34.13
Radeon HD 7520G (Scrapper)	June 2012	TeraScale 3 (32 nm)	192:12:4	496	685	1.98	5.95	190.46	DDR3; 128-bit	1333 to 2133	21.33–34.13
Radeon HD 7600G (Devastator)	September 2012	TeraScale 3 (32 nm)	384:24:8	320	424	2.56	7.68	245.76	DDR3; 128-bit	1333 to 2133	21.33–34.13
Radeon HD 7620G (Devastator)	May 2012	TeraScale 3 (32 nm)	384:24:8	360	497	2.88	8.64	276.48	DDR3; 128-bit	1333 to 2133	21.33–34.13
Radeon HD 7640G (Devastator)	May 2012	TeraScale 3 (32 nm)	256:16:8	496	685	3.97	7.94	253.95	DDR3; 128-bit	1333 to 2133	21.33–34.13
Radeon HD 7660G (Devastator)	May 2012	TeraScale 3 (32 nm)	384:24:8	496	685	3.97	11.9	380.93	DDR3; 128-bit	1333 to 2133	21.33–34.13

== Radeon Feature Matrix ==
The following table shows features of AMD/ATI's GPUs (see also: List of AMD graphics processing units).

Name of GPU series	Wonder	Mach	3D Rage	Rage Pro	Rage 128	R100	R200	R300	R400	R500	R600	RV670	R700	Evergreen	Northern Islands		Southern Islands	Sea Islands	Volcanic Islands	Arctic Islands/Polaris	Vega	Navi 1x	Navi 2x	Navi 3x	Navi 4x
Released	1986	1991	Apr; 1996	Mar; 1997	Aug; 1998	Apr; 2000	Aug; 2001	Sep; 2002	May; 2004	Oct; 2005	May; 2007	Nov; 2007	Jun; 2008	Sep; 2009	Oct; 2010	Dec; 2010	Jan; 2012	Sep; 2013	Jun; 2015	Jun 2016, Apr 2017, Aug 2019	Jun 2017, Feb 2019	Jul; 2019	Nov; 2020	Dec; 2022	Feb; 2025
Marketing Name	Wonder	Mach	3D; Rage	Rage; Pro	Rage; 128	Radeon; 7000	Radeon; 8000	Radeon; 9000	Radeon; X700/X800	Radeon; X1000	Radeon; HD 2000	Radeon; HD 3000	Radeon; HD 4000	Radeon; HD 5000	Radeon; HD 6000		Radeon; HD 7000	Radeon; 200	Radeon; 300	Radeon; 400/500/600	Radeon; RX Vega, Radeon VII	Radeon; RX 5000	Radeon; RX 6000	Radeon; RX 7000	Radeon; RX 9000
AMD support	Ended																			Current					
Kind	2D		3D																						
Instruction set architecture	Not publicly known									Multiple (Note: R500 has two instruction sets. Vertex shader cores: "PVS instruction set". Pixel shader cores: "US instruction set".)	TeraScale instruction set						GCN instruction set					RDNA instruction set			
Microarchitecture	Not publicly known					GFX1		GFX2			TeraScale 1 (VLIW5) (GFX3)			TeraScale 2 (VLIW5) (GFX4)	TeraScale 2 (VLIW5) up to 68xx (GFX4)	TeraScale 3 (VLIW4) in 69xx (GFX5)	GCN 1st gen (GFX6)	GCN 2nd gen (GFX7)	GCN 3rd gen (GFX8)	GCN 4th gen (GFX8)	GCN 5th gen (GFX9)	RDNA (GFX10.1)	RDNA 2 (GFX10.3)	RDNA 3 (GFX11)	RDNA 4 (GFX12)
Type	Fixed pipeline (Note: The Radeon R100 Series has programmable pixel shaders, but do not fully comply with DirectX 8 or Pixel Shader 1.0. See article on R100's pixel shaders.)						Programmable pixel & vertex pipelines				Unified shader model														
Direct3D	—N/a		5.0	6.0		7.0	8.1	9.0; 11 (9_2)	9.0b 11 (9_2)	9.0c 11 (9_3)	10.0; 11 (10_0)	10.1; 11 (10_1)		11 (11_0)			11 (11_1); 12 (11_1)	11 (12_0); 12 (12_0)			11 (12_1); 12 (12_1)		11 (12_1); 12 (12_2)		
Shader model	—N/a						1.4	2.0+	2.0b	3.0	4.0	4.1		5.0			5.1	5.1; 6.5			6.7				6.8
OpenGL	—N/a			1.1	1.2	1.3		1.5 (Note: R300, R400 and R500 based cards do not fully comply with OpenGL 2+ as the hardware does not support all types of non-power of two (NPOT) textures.)			3.3			4.5 (Windows), 4.6 (Linux Mesa 25.2+)			4.6 (Note: OpenGL 4+ compliance requires supporting FP64 shaders and these are emulated on some TeraScale chips using 32-bit hardware.)								
Vulkan	—N/a															1.1 (Note: Vulkan support is theoretically possible but has not been implemented in a stable driver.)	1.3 (Note: Vulkan support in Linux relies on the AMDgpu kernel driver, the radeon driver does not support Vulkan.)		1.4						
OpenCL	—N/a										Close to Metal		1.1 (not supported by Mesa)	1.2+ (on Linux: 1.1+ (no Image support on Clover, with Rusticl) with Mesa, 1.2+ on GCN 1.Gen)				2.0+ (Adrenalin driver on Win 7+) (on Linux ROCm, Mesa 1.2+ (no support in Clover, only Rusticl, Mesa, 2.0+ and 3.0 with AMD drivers or AMD ROCm), 5th gen: 2.2 win 10+ and Linux RocM 5.0+				2.2+ and 3.0 Windows 8.1+ and Linux ROCm 5.0+ (Mesa Rusticl 1.2+ and 3.0 (2.1+ and 2.2+))			
HSA / ROCm	—N/a																Yes					?			
Video decoding ASIC	—N/a										Avivo/UVD	UVD+	UVD 2	UVD 2.2	UVD 3		UVD 4	UVD 4.2	UVD 5.0 or 6.0	UVD 6.3	UVD 7 (Note: The UVD and VCE were replaced by the Video Core Next (VCN) ASIC in the Raven Ridge APU implementation of Vega.)	VCN 2.0	VCN 3.0	VCN 4.0	VCN 5.0
Video encoding ASIC	—N/a																VCE 1.0	VCE 2.0	VCE 3.0 or 3.1	VCE 3.4	VCE 4.0	VCN 2.0	VCN 3.0	VCN 4.0	VCN 5.0
Fluid Motion (Note: Video processing for video frame rate interpolation technique. In Windows it works as a DirectShow filter in your player. In Linux, there is no support on the part of drivers and / or community.)	No																	Yes				No		?	
Power saving	?										PowerPlay				PowerTune		PowerTune & ZeroCore Power					?			
TrueAudio	—N/a																	Via dedicated DSP		Via shaders					
FreeSync	—N/a																	1; 2							
HDCP (Note: To play protected video content, it also requires card, operating system, driver, and application support. A compatible HDCP display is also needed for this. HDCP is mandatory for the output of certain audio formats, placing additional constraints on the multimedia setup.)	—N/a										?							1.4		2.2		2.3			
PlayReady	—N/a																			3.0	No	3.0			
Supported displays (Note: More displays may be supported with native DisplayPort connections, or splitting the maximum resolution between multiple monitors with active converters.)						1–2	2							2–6								?			4
Max. resolution	?													2–6 × 2560×1600			2–6 × 4096×2160 @ 30 Hz			2–6 × 5120×2880 @ 60 Hz	3 × 7680×4320 @ 60 Hz	7680×4320 @ 60 Hz PowerColor		7680x4320 @165 Hz	7680x4320
/drm/radeon (Note: DRM (Direct Rendering Manager) is a component of the Linux kernel. AMDgpu is the Linux kernel module. Support in this table refers to the most current version.)						Yes													—N/a						
/drm/amdgpu	—N/a																Yes Kernel 6.19+		Yes						

== Graphics device drivers ==
=== AMD's proprietary graphics device driver "Catalyst" ===
AMD Catalyst is being developed for Microsoft Windows and Linux. As of July 2014, other operating systems are not officially supported. This may be different for the AMD FirePro brand, which is based on identical hardware but features OpenGL-certified graphics device drivers.

AMD Catalyst supports all features advertised for the Radeon brand.

=== Free and open-source graphics device driver "Radeon" ===
The free and open-source drivers are primarily developed on Linux and for Linux, but have been ported to other operating systems as well. Each driver is composed out of five parts:

1. Linux kernel component DRM
2. Linux kernel component KMS driver: basically the device driver for the display controller
3. user-space component libDRM
4. user-space component in Mesa 3D
5. a special and distinct 2D graphics device driver for X.Org Server, which will be replaced by Glamor

The free and open-source "Radeon" graphics driver supports most of the features implemented into the Radeon line of GPUs.

The free and open-source "Radeon" graphics device drivers are not reverse engineered, but based on documentation released by AMD.

== See also ==
- AMD FirePro
- AMD FireMV
- AMD FireStream
- List of AMD graphics processing units
