= Heterogeneous System Architecture =

Computing system

Heterogeneous System Architecture (HSA) is a cross-vendor set of specifications that allow for the integration of central processing units and graphics processors on the same bus, with shared memory and tasks. The HSA is being developed by the HSA Foundation, which includes (among many others) AMD and ARM. The platform's stated aim is to reduce communication latency between CPUs, GPUs and other compute devices, and make these various devices more compatible from a programmer's perspective, relieving the programmer of the task of planning the moving of data between devices' disjoint memories (as must currently be done with OpenCL or CUDA).

CUDA and OpenCL as well as most other fairly advanced programming languages can use HSA to increase their execution performance. Heterogeneous computing is widely used in system-on-chip devices such as tablets, smartphones, other mobile devices, and video game consoles. HSA allows programs to use the graphics processor for floating point calculations without separate memory or scheduling.

== Rationale ==
The rationale behind HSA is to ease the burden on programmers when offloading calculations to the GPU. Originally driven solely by AMD and called the FSA, the idea was extended to encompass processing units other than GPUs, such as other manufacturers' DSPs, as well.

Steps performed when offloading calculations to the GPU on a non-HSA system

Steps performed when offloading calculations to the GPU on a HSA system, using the HSA functionality

Modern GPUs are very well suited to perform single instruction, multiple data (SIMD) and single instruction, multiple threads (SIMT), while modern CPUs are still being optimized for branching. etc.

== Overview ==
Originally introduced by embedded systems such as the Cell Broadband Engine, sharing system memory directly between multiple system actors makes heterogeneous computing more mainstream. Heterogeneous computing itself refers to systems that contain multiple processing units – central processing units (CPUs), graphics processing units (GPUs), digital signal processors (DSPs), or any type of application-specific integrated circuits (ASICs). The system architecture allows any accelerator, for instance a graphics processor, to operate at the same processing level as the system's CPU.

Among its main features, HSA defines a unified virtual address space for compute devices: where GPUs traditionally have their own memory, separate from the main (CPU) memory, HSA requires these devices to share page tables so that devices can exchange data by sharing pointers. This is to be supported by custom memory management units. To render interoperability possible and also to ease various aspects of programming, HSA is intended to be ISA-agnostic for both CPUs and accelerators, and to support high-level programming languages.

So far, the HSA specifications cover:

=== HSA intermediate layer ===
HSAIL (Heterogeneous System Architecture Intermediate Language), a virtual instruction set for parallel programs

- similar to LLVM intermediate representation and SPIR (used by OpenCL and Vulkan)
- finalized to a specific instruction set by a JIT compiler
- make late decisions on which core(s) should run a task
- explicitly parallel
- supports exceptions, virtual functions and other high-level features
- debugging support

=== HSA memory model ===
- compatible with C++11, OpenCL, Java and .NET memory models
- relaxed consistency
- designed to support both managed languages (e.g. Java) and unmanaged languages (e.g. C)
- will make it much easier to develop 3rd-party compilers for a wide range of heterogeneous products programmed in Fortran, C++, C++ AMP, Java, et al.

=== HSA dispatcher and run-time ===
- designed to enable heterogeneous task queueing: a work queue per core, distribution of work into queues, load balancing by work stealing
- any core can schedule work for any other, including itself
- significant reduction of overhead of scheduling work for a core

Mobile devices are one of the HSA's application areas, in which it yields improved power efficiency.

=== Block diagrams ===
The illustrations below compare CPU-GPU coordination under HSA versus under traditional architectures.

Standard architecture with a discrete GPU attached to the PCI Express bus. Zero-copy between the GPU and CPU is not possible due to distinct physical memories.

HSA brings unified virtual memory and facilitates passing pointers over PCI Express instead of copying the entire data.

In partitioned main memory, one part of the system memory is exclusively allocated to the GPU. As a result, zero-copy operation is not possible.

Unified main memory, where GPU and CPU are HSA-enabled. This makes zero-copy operation possible.

The CPU's MMU and the GPU's IOMMU must both comply with HSA hardware specifications.

== Software support ==
AMD GPUs contain certain additional functional units intended to be used as part of HSA. In Linux, kernel driver amdkfd provides required support.

Some of the HSA-specific features implemented in the hardware need to be supported by the operating system kernel and specific device drivers. For example, support for AMD Radeon and AMD FirePro graphics cards, and APUs based on Graphics Core Next (GCN), was merged into version 3.19 of the Linux kernel mainline, released on 8 February 2015. Programs do not interact directly with amdkfd, but queue their jobs utilizing the HSA runtime. This very first implementation, known as amdkfd, focuses on "Kaveri" or "Berlin" APUs and works alongside the existing Radeon kernel graphics driver.

Additionally, amdkfd supports heterogeneous queuing (HQ), which aims to simplify the distribution of computational jobs among multiple CPUs and GPUs from the programmer's perspective. Support for heterogeneous memory management (HMM), suited only for graphics hardware featuring version 2 of the AMD's IOMMU, was accepted into the Linux kernel mainline version 4.14.

Integrated support for HSA platforms has been announced for the "Sumatra" release of OpenJDK, due in 2015.

AMD APP SDK is AMD's proprietary software development kit targeting parallel computing, available for Microsoft Windows and Linux. Bolt is a C++ template library optimized for heterogeneous computing.

GPUOpen comprehends a couple of other software tools related to HSA. CodeXL version 2.0 includes an HSA profiler.

== Hardware support ==
=== AMD ===
As of February 2015, only AMD's "Kaveri" A-series APUs (cf. "Kaveri" desktop processors and "Kaveri" mobile processors) and Sony's PlayStation 4 allowed the integrated GPU to access memory via version 2 of the AMD's IOMMU. Earlier APUs (Trinity and Richland) included the version 2 IOMMU functionality, but only for use by an external GPU connected via PCI Express.

Post-2015 Carrizo and Bristol Ridge APUs also include the version 2 IOMMU functionality for the integrated GPU.

The following table shows features of AMD's processors with 3D graphics, including APUs (see also: List of AMD processors with 3D graphics).

Platform			High, standard and low power														Low and ultra-low power								
Codename	Server	Basic						Toronto																	
Codename	Server	Micro																Kyoto							
Codename	Desktop	Performance													Raphael	Phoenix									
Codename	Desktop	Mainstream	Llano	Trinity	Richland	Kaveri	Kaveri Refresh (Godavari)	Carrizo	Bristol Ridge	Raven Ridge	Picasso	Renoir	Cezanne		Raphael	Phoenix									
Codename	Desktop	Entry	Llano	Trinity	Richland	Kaveri	Kaveri Refresh (Godavari)	Carrizo	Bristol Ridge	Raven Ridge	Picasso	Renoir	Cezanne			Phoenix									
Codename	Desktop	Basic																Kabini				Dalí			
Codename	Mobile	Performance										Renoir	Cezanne	Rembrandt	Dragon Range										
Codename	Mobile	Mainstream	Llano	Trinity	Richland	Kaveri		Carrizo	Bristol Ridge	Raven Ridge	Picasso	Renoir Lucienne	Cezanne Barceló	Rembrandt	Dragon Range	Phoenix									
Codename	Mobile	Entry	Llano	Trinity	Richland	Kaveri		Carrizo	Bristol Ridge	Raven Ridge												Dalí			Mendocino
Codename	Mobile	Basic															Desna, Ontario, Zacate	Kabini, Temash	Beema, Mullins	Carrizo-L	Stoney Ridge	Dalí	Pollock		Mendocino
Codename	Embedded			Trinity		Bald Eagle		Merlin Falcon, Brown Falcon		Great Horned Owl		Grey Hawk					Ontario, Zacate	Kabini	Steppe Eagle, Crowned Eagle, LX-Family		Prairie Falcon	Banded Kestrel		River Hawk	
Released			Aug 2011	Oct 2012	Jun 2013	Jan 2014	2015	Jun 2015	Jun 2016	Oct 2017	Jan 2019	Mar 2020	Jan 2021	Jan 2022	Sep 2022	Jan 2023	Jan 2011	May 2013	Apr 2014	May 2015	Feb 2016	Apr 2019	Jul 2020	Jun 2022	Nov 2022
CPU microarchitecture			K10	Piledriver		Steamroller		Excavator	"Excavator+"	Zen	Zen+	Zen 2	Zen 3	Zen 3+	Zen 4		Bobcat	Jaguar	Puma	Puma+	"Excavator+"	Zen		Zen+	"Zen 2+"
ISA			x86-64 v1	x86-64 v2				x86-64 v3							x86-64 v4		x86-64 v1	x86-64 v2			x86-64 v3				
Socket	Desktop	Performance	—N/a												AM5	—N/a	—N/a								
Socket	Desktop	Mainstream	—N/a					AM4						—N/a	AM5	—N/a	—N/a								
Socket	Desktop	Entry	FM1	FM2		FM2+		FM2+ (Note: For FM2+ Excavator models: A8-7680, A6-7480 & Athlon X4 845.), AM4	AM4					—N/a			—N/a								
Socket	Desktop	Basic	—N/a														—N/a	AM1	—N/a			FP5	—N/a		
Socket	Other		FS1	FS1+, FP2		FP3		FP4		FP5		FP6		FP7	FL1	FP7; FP7r2; FP8	FT1	FT3	FT3b		FP4	FP5	FT5	FP5	FT6
PCI Express version			2.0			3.0								4.0	5.0	4.0	2.0				3.0				
CXL			—N/a														—N/a								
Fab. (nm)			GF 32SHP (HKMG SOI)			GF 28SHP (HKMG bulk)				GF 14LPP (FinFET bulk)	GF 12LP (FinFET bulk)	TSMC N7 (FinFET bulk)		TSMC N6 (FinFET bulk)	CCD: TSMC N5 (FinFET bulk) cIOD: TSMC N6 (FinFET bulk)	TSMC 4nm (FinFET bulk)	TSMC N40 (bulk)	TSMC N28 (HKMG bulk)	GF 28SHP (HKMG bulk)			GF 14LPP (FinFET bulk)		GF 12LP (FinFET bulk)	TSMC N6 (FinFET bulk)
Die area (mm^{2})			228	246		245		245	250	210		156	180	210	CCD: (2x) 70 cIOD: 122	178	75 (+ 28 FCH)	107		?	125	149			~100
Min TDP (W)			35	17				12				10		15	65	35	4.5	4	3.95	10	6			12	8
Max APU TDP (W)			100			95		65						45	170	54	18	25					6	54	15
Max stock APU base clock (GHz)			3	3.8	4.1	4.1		3.7	3.8	3.6	3.7	3.8	4.0	3.3	4.7	4.3	1.75	2.2	2	2.2	3.2	2.6	1.2	3.35	2.8
Max APUs per node (Note: A PC would be one node.)			1														1								
Max core dies per CPU			1												2	1	1								
Max CCX per core die			1									2	1				1								
Max cores per CCX			4										8				2	4			2			4	
Max CPU (Note: An APU combines a CPU and a GPU. Both have cores.) cores per APU			4									8			16	8	2	4			2			4	
Max threads per CPU core			1							2							1					2			
Integer pipeline structure			3+3	2+2						4+2		4+2+1	1+3+3+1+2				1+1+1+1				2+2	4+2			4+2+1
i386, i486, i586, CMOV, NOPL, i686, PAE, NX bit, CMPXCHG16B, AMD-V, RVI, ABM, and 64-bit LAHF/SAHF			Yes														Yes								
IOMMU (Note: Requires firmware support.)			—N/a	v2													v1		v2						
BMI1, AES-NI, CLMUL, and F16C			—N/a	Yes													—N/a	Yes							
MOVBE			—N/a					Yes									—N/a	Yes							
AVIC, BMI2, RDRAND, and MWAITX/MONITORX			—N/a					Yes									—N/a				Yes				
SME (Note: Requires firmware support.), TSME, ADX, SHA, RDSEED, SMAP, SMEP, XSAVEC, XSAVES, XRSTORS, CLFLUSHOPT, CLZERO, and PTE Coalescing			—N/a							Yes							—N/a					Yes			
GMET, WBNOINVD, CLWB, QOS, PQE-BW, RDPID, RDPRU, and MCOMMIT			—N/a									Yes					—N/a								Yes
MPK, VAES			—N/a										Yes				—N/a								
SGX			—N/a														—N/a								
FPUs per core			1	0.5						1							1				0.5	1			
Pipes per FPU			2														2								
FPU pipe width			128-bit									256-bit					80-bit	128-bit							256-bit
CPU instruction set SIMD level			SSE4a (Note: No SSE4. No SSSE3.)	AVX				AVX2							AVX-512		SSSE3	AVX			AVX2				
3DNow!			3DNow!+	—N/a													—N/a								
PREFETCH/PREFETCHW			Yes														Yes								
GFNI			—N/a												Yes		—N/a								
AMX			—N/a														—N/a								
FMA4, LWP, TBM, and XOP			—N/a	Yes						—N/a							—N/a				Yes	—N/a			
FMA3			—N/a	Yes													—N/a				Yes				
AMD XDNA			—N/a													Yes	—N/a								
L1 data cache per core (KiB)			64	16				32									32								
L1 data cache associativity (ways)			2	4				8									8								
L1 instruction caches per core			1	0.5						1							1				0.5	1			
Max APU total L1 instruction cache (KiB)			256	128		192				256					512	256	64		128		96	128			
L1 instruction cache associativity (ways)			2			3				4		8					2				3	4			8
L2 caches per core			1	0.5						1							1				0.5	1			
Max APU total L2 cache (MiB)			4					2				4			16		1	2			1			2	
L2 cache associativity (ways)			16							8							16					8			
Max on-die L3 cache per CCX (MiB)			—N/a							4			16		32		—N/a						4		
Max 3D V-Cache per CCD (MiB)			—N/a							—N/a					64	—N/a	—N/a						—N/a		
Max total in-CCD L3 cache per APU (MiB)			—N/a							4		8	16		64		—N/a						4		
Max. total 3D V-Cache per APU (MiB)			—N/a							—N/a					64	—N/a	—N/a						—N/a		
Max. board L3 cache per APU (MiB)			—N/a							—N/a							—N/a						—N/a		
Max total L3 cache per APU (MiB)			—N/a							4		8	16		128		—N/a						4		
APU L3 cache associativity (ways)			—N/a							16							—N/a						16		
L3 cache scheme			—N/a							Victim							—N/a						Victim		
Max. L4 cache			—N/a														—N/a								
Max stock DRAM support			DDR3-1866		DDR3-2133			DDR3-2133, DDR4-2400	DDR4-2400	DDR4-2933		DDR4-3200, LPDDR4-4266		DDR5-4800, LPDDR5-6400	DDR5-5200	DDR5-5600, LPDDR5x-7500	DDR3L-1333	DDR3L-1600	DDR3L-1866		DDR3-1866, DDR4-2400	DDR4-2400	DDR4-1600	DDR4-3200	LPDDR5-5500
Max DRAM channels per APU			2														1					2	1	2	
Max stock DRAM bandwidth (GB/s) per APU			29.866		34.132			38.400		46.932		68.256		102.400	83.200	120.000	10.666	12.800	14.933		19.200	38.400	12.800	51.200	88.000
GPU microarchitecture			TeraScale 2 (VLIW5)	TeraScale 3 (VLIW4)		GCN 2nd gen		GCN 3rd gen		GCN 5th gen				RDNA 2		RDNA 3	TeraScale 2 (VLIW5)	GCN 2nd gen			GCN 3rd gen	GCN 5th gen			RDNA 2
GPU instruction set			TeraScale instruction set			GCN instruction set								RDNA instruction set			TeraScale instruction set	GCN instruction set							RDNA instruction set
Max stock GPU base clock (MHz)			600	800	844	866		1108		1250	1400	2100		2400	400		538	600	?	847	900	1200	600	1300	1900
Max stock GPU base GFLOPS (Note: Single-precision performance is calculated from the base (or boost) core clock speed based on a FMA operation.)			480	614.4	648.1	886.7		1134.5		1760	1971.2	2150.4		3686.4	102.4		86	?	?	?	345.6	460.8	230.4	1331.2	486.4
3D engine (Note: Unified shaders : texture mapping units : render output units)			Up to 400:20:8	Up to 384:24:6		Up to 512:32:8				Up to 704:44:16		Up to 512:32:8		768:48:8	128:8:4		80:8:4	128:8:4			Up to 192:12:8	Up to 192:12:4	192:12:4	Up to 512:?:?	128:?:?
3D engine			IOMMUv1			IOMMUv2											IOMMUv1		?		IOMMUv2				
Video decoder			UVD 3.0			UVD 4.2		UVD 6.0		VCN 1.0		VCN 2.1	VCN 2.2	VCN 3.1		?	UVD 3.0	UVD 4.0	UVD 4.2		UVD 6.2	VCN 1.0			VCN 3.1
Video encoder			—N/a	VCE 1.0		VCE 2.0		VCE 3.1		VCN 1.0		VCN 2.1	VCN 2.2	VCN 3.1		?	—N/a	VCE 2.0			VCE 3.4	VCN 1.0			VCN 3.1
AMD Fluid Motion			No			Yes				No							No		Yes			No			
GPU power saving			PowerPlay	PowerTune													PowerPlay	PowerTune							
TrueAudio			—N/a			Yes							?				—N/a	Yes							
FreeSync			—N/a			1; 2											—N/a	1; 2							
HDCP (Note: To play protected video content, it also requires card, operating system, driver, and application support. A compatible HDCP display is also needed for this. HDCP is mandatory for the output of certain audio formats, placing additional constraints on the multimedia setup.)			?			1.4				2.2				2.3			?	1.4				2.2			2.3
PlayReady			—N/a							3.0 not yet							—N/a					3.0 not yet			
Supported displays (Note: To feed more than two displays, the additional panels must have native DisplayPort support. Alternatively active DisplayPort-to-DVI/HDMI/VGA adapters can be employed.)			2–3	2–4				3		3 (desktop); 4 (mobile, embedded)		4					2				3	4		4	
/drm/radeon (Note: DRM (Direct Rendering Manager) is a component of the Linux kernel. Support in this table refers to the most current version.)			Yes						—N/a								Yes				—N/a				
/drm/amdgpu			—N/a			Yes											—N/a	Yes							

=== ARM ===
ARM's Bifrost microarchitecture, as implemented in the Mali-G71, is fully compliant with the HSA 1.1 hardware specifications. As of June 2016, ARM has not announced software support that would use this hardware feature.

== See also ==
- General-purpose computing on graphics processing units (GPGPU)
- Non-uniform memory access (NUMA)
- OpenMP
- Shared memory
- Zero-copy
- A technique enabling zero-copy operation for a CPU and a parallel accelerator
