= Graphics Core Next =

Series of microarchitectures and instruction set architecture by AMD

GCN
- Designer: AMD
- Bits: 32-bit and 64-bit
- Introduced: 2012
- Design: SIMT
- Type: Register–memory (LDS/GDS), Load-store (Scalar/Vector)
- Encoding: Variable (4-byte or 8-byte)
- Branching: Vector condition code, Scalar condition code, Execute mask
- Endianness: Little
- Page size: 4 KB
- Extensions: FLAT, SMEM, SDWA, DPP, PERMUTE, F16, VOP3P, SCRATCH, GLOBAL
- Open: No
- Predecessor: TeraScale
- Successor: RDNA, CDNA

Registers
- General-purpose: Variable (8 to 104 visible to each scalar unit)
- Floating-point: Variable (4 to 256 visible to each vector unit)

GCN (also known as Graphics Core Next) is a series of graphics processor architectures developed by AMD. GCN was introduced in 2012 as a non-VLIW redesign of AMD's TeraScale architecture.

== Introduction ==
CPUs typically expose programming models architecturally equivalent to the classic RISC pipeline where individual scalar instructions are fetched, decoded, and executed sequentially. (Note: Sequential from the perspective of externally-visible architectural state. Modern CPUs may be superscalar or execute instructions out of order internally, but are still required to resolve architectural state as if execution were sequential (increasing hardware/design complexity).)

In contrast, GPUs typically expose an explicitly data-parallel programming model. In both GCN and TeraScale, programs are organized as parallel threads, where each thread considers different elements of an input data set.

Threads are executed in hardware in groups of 64 called a "wavefront". Wavefronts differ from a classic RISC pipeline in that all threads in the wavefront share a single program counter, and execute in parallel and in lock-step. The ability to issue 64 operations per instruction fetch significantly reduces area and power requirements. (Note: Contrast to superscalar and multi-core CPU designs, which require more power, more area, and more design complexity to complete the same operations at the same rate.)

== History ==
In AMD's previous TeraScale design, vector ALUs executed 16 groups of 4 scalar operations from a single wavefront per cycle. (Note: Earlier versions of TeraScale included a 5th slot, which was dedicated to transcendental operations. AMD removed the 5th slot as an optimization, as it found the transcendental unit was heavily under-used in practice.) Each operation's placement within a group is determined statically, and correspond to TeraScale VLIW instruction slots. Effective utilization of all available slots in each instruction depends on a compiler's ability to find independent operations within a single wavefront.

The GCN architecture removes the instruction slot concept completely: each (non-VLIW) instruction instead encodes a single operation. A single vector unit now executes 16 scalar operations from 4 different wavefronts per cycle.

AMD's goal in making this change was to make the performance and occupancy of GCN dependent on wavefront-parallelism, contrast to TeraScale which is dependent on a compiler's ability to find independent operations within a single wavefront.

== Instruction set ==
The GCN instruction set is owned by AMD and was developed specifically for GPUs.

Family	Document		New Features/Changes	Example Products
Family	Name	Rev.	New Features/Changes	Example Products
Southern Islands	Southern Islands Series Instruction Set Architecture	1.1 (Note: Contains several documentation bugs (e.g: incorrect bit definitions); defines an S_MOV_FED_B32 instruction not mentioned in any other documents)		Radeon HD 7970; Radeon HD 8970
Southern Islands	Southern Islands Series Instruction Set Architecture	1.4		Radeon HD 7970; Radeon HD 8970
Sea Islands	Sea Islands Series Instruction Set Architecture	1.0	FLAT instructions, thread-private memory, 96-bit load/store, conditional debug instructions, F64 rounding instructions	Radeon R9 290X
Sea Islands	Sea Islands Series Instruction Set Architecture	1.3	FLAT instructions, thread-private memory, 96-bit load/store, conditional debug instructions, F64 rounding instructions	Radeon R9 290X
Volcanic Islands, Arctic Islands	Graphics Core Next Architecture, Generation 3	1.0	binary-incompatible with previous versions, 16-bit floating-point math, scalar memory writes, VGPR indexing, DPP instructions, SDWA instructions, permute instructions	Radeon R9 390; Radeon RX 480; Radeon RX 580
Volcanic Islands, Arctic Islands	Graphics Core Next Architecture, Generation 3	1.1	binary-incompatible with previous versions, 16-bit floating-point math, scalar memory writes, VGPR indexing, DPP instructions, SDWA instructions, permute instructions	Radeon R9 390; Radeon RX 480; Radeon RX 580
Vega	"Vega" Instruction Set Architecture		packed 16-bit arithmetic, scalar memory atomics SCRATCH instructions, GLOBAL instructions	Radeon RX Vega 64
Vega 7nm	"Vega" 7nm Instruction Set Architecture		packed dot product	Radeon Instinct MI50; Radeon VII

=== Compiler Support ===
LLVM has code generation support for all GCN variants.

Mesa uses the Mesa-internal ACO compiler for GCN code generation.

GCC implements code generation for Vega and Vega 7nm. Older versions of GCC previously included code generation support for Fiji (Volcanic Islands), though this was removed in GCC 15. All other GCN variants are unsupported. GCC 10 introduced offloading via OpenMP and OpenACC.

== Architecture ==
=== Command processing ===
GCN command processing: Each Asynchronous Compute Engines (ACE) can parse incoming commands and dispatch work to the Compute Units (CUs). Each ACE can manage up to 8 independent queues. The ACEs can operate in parallel with the graphics command processor and two DMA engines. The graphics command processor handles graphics queues, the ACEs handle compute queues, and the DMA engines handle copy queues. Each queue can dispatch work items without waiting for other tasks to complete, allowing independent command streams to be interleaved on the GPU's Shader.

==== Graphics Command Processor ====
The Graphics Command Processor (GCP) is a functional unit of the GCN microarchitecture. Among other tasks, it is responsible for the handling of asynchronous shaders.

==== Asynchronous Compute Engine ====
The Asynchronous Compute Engine (ACE) is a distinct functional block serving computing purposes, whose purpose is similar to that of the Graphics Command Processor.

==== Schedulers ====
Since the third iteration of GCN, the hardware contains two schedulers: one to schedule "wavefronts" during shader execution (the CU Scheduler, or Compute Unit Scheduler) and the other to schedule execution of draw and compute queues. The latter helps performance by executing compute operations when the compute units (CUs) are underutilized due to graphics commands limited by fixed function pipeline speed or bandwidth. This functionality is known as Async Compute.

For a given shader, the GPU drivers may also schedule instructions on the CPU to minimize latency.

=== Geometric processor ===
Geometry processor

The geometry processor contains a Geometry Assembler, a Tesselator, and a Vertex Assembler.

The Tesselator is capable of doing tessellation in hardware as defined by Direct3D 11 and OpenGL 4.6.

=== Compute units ===
One compute unit (CU) combines 64 shader processors with 4 texture mapping units (TMUs). The compute units are separate from, but feed into, the render output units (ROPs). Each compute unit consists of the following:

- a CU scheduler
- a Branch & Message Unit
- 4 16-lane-wide SIMD Vector Units (SIMD-VUs)
- 4 64 KiB vector general-purpose register (VGPR) files
- 1 scalar unit (SU)
- a 8 KiB scalar GPR file
- a local data share of 64 KiB
- 4 Texture Filter Units
- 16 Texture Fetch Load/Store Units
- a 16 KiB level 1 (L1) cache

Four Compute units are wired to share a 16KiB L1 instruction cache and a 32KiB L1 data cache, both of which are read-only. A SIMD-VU operates on 16 elements at a time (per cycle), while a SU can operate on one a time (one/cycle). In addition, the SU handles some other operations, such as branching.

Every SIMD-VU has some private memory where it stores its registers. There are two types of registers: scalar registers (S0, S1, etc.), which hold 4 bytes number each, and vector registers (V0, V1, etc.), which each represent a set of 64 4-byte numbers. On the vector registers, every operation is done in parallel on the 64 numbers. which correspond to 64 inputs. For example, it may work on 64 different pixels at a time (for each of them the inputs are slightly different, and thus you get slightly different color at the end).

Every SIMD-VU has room for 512 scalar registers and 256 vector registers.

AMD has claimed that each GCN compute unit (CU) has 64 KiB Local Data Share (LDS).

==== CU scheduler ====
The CU scheduler is the hardware functional block, choosing which wavefronts the SIMD-VU executes. It picks one SIMD-VU per cycle for scheduling. This is not to be confused with other hardware or software schedulers.

==== Wavefront ====
A shader is a small program written in GLSL that performs graphics processing, and a kernel is a small program written in OpenCL that performs GPGPU processing. These processes don't need that many registers, but they do need to load data from system or graphics memory. This operation comes with significant latency. AMD and Nvidia chose similar approaches to hide this unavoidable latency: the grouping of multiple threads. AMD calls such a group a "wavefront", whereas Nvidia calls it a "warp". A group of threads is the most basic unit of scheduling of GPUs that implement this approach to hide latency. It is the minimum size of the data processed in SIMD fashion, the smallest executable unit of code, and the way to processes a single instruction over all of the threads in it at the same time.

In all GCN GPUs, a "wavefront" consists of 64 threads, and in all Nvidia GPUs, a "warp" consists of 32 threads.

AMD's solution is to attribute multiple wavefronts to each SIMD-VU. The hardware distributes the registers to the different wavefronts, and when one wavefront is waiting on some result, which lies in memory, the CU Scheduler assigns the SIMD-VU another wavefront. Wavefronts are attributed per SIMD-VU. SIMD-VUs do not exchange wavefronts. A maximum of 10 wavefronts can be attributed per SIMD-VU (thus 40 per CU).

AMD CodeXL shows tables with the relationship between number of SGPRs and VGPRs to the number of wavefronts, but essentially, for SGPRS it is between 104 and 512 per number of wavefronts, and for VGPRS it is 256 per number of wavefronts.

Note that in conjunction with the SSE instructions, this concept of the most basic level of parallelism is often called a "vector width". The vector width is characterized by the total number of bits in it.

==== SIMD Vector Unit ====
Each SIMD Vector Unit has:

- a 16-lane integer and floating point vector Arithmetic Logic Unit (ALU)
- 64 KiB Vector General Purpose Register (VGPR) file
- 10× 48-bit Program Counters
- Instruction buffer for 10 wavefronts (each wavefront is a group of 64 threads, or the size of one logical VGPR)
- A 64-thread wavefront issues to a 16-lane SIMD Unit over four cycles

Each SIMD-VU has 10 wavefront instruction buffers, and it takes 4 cycles to execute one wavefront.

=== Audio and video acceleration blocks ===
Many implementations of GCN are typically accompanied by several of AMD's other ASIC blocks. Including but not limited to the Unified Video Decoder, Video Coding Engine, and AMD TrueAudio.

==== Video Coding Engine ====
The Video Coding Engine is a video encoding ASIC, first introduced with the Radeon HD 7000 series.

The initial version of the VCE added support for encoding I and P frames H.264 in the YUV420 pixel format, along with SVE temporal encode and Display Encode Mode, while the second version added B-frame support for YUV420 and YUV444 I-frames.

VCE 3.0 formed a part of the third generation of GCN, adding high-quality video scaling and the HEVC (H.265) codec.

VCE 4.0 was part of the Vega architecture, and was subsequently succeeded by Video Core Next.

=== Unified virtual memory ===
In a preview in 2011, AnandTech wrote about the unified virtual memory, supported by Graphics Core Next.

Classical desktop computer architecture with a distinct graphics card over PCI Express. CPU and GPU have their distinct physical memory, with different address spaces. The entire data needs to be copied over the PCIe bus. Note: the diagram shows bandwidths, but not the memory latency.

GCN supports "unified virtual memory", hence enabling zero-copy, instead of the data, only the pointers are copied, "passed". This is a paramount HSA feature.

Integrated graphics-solutions (and AMD APUs with TeraScale graphics) suffer under partitioned main memory: a part of the system memory is allocated to the GPU exclusively. Zero-copy is not possible, data has to be copied (over the system memory bus) from one partition to the other.

AMD APUs with GCN graphics gain from unified main memory conserving scarce bandwidth

=== Heterogeneous System Architecture (HSA) ===
GCN includes special purpose function blocks to be used by HSA. Support for these function blocks is available through amdkfd since Linux kernel 3.19.

Some of the specific HSA features implemented in the hardware need support from the operating system's kernel (its subsystems) and/or from specific device drivers. For example, in July 2014, AMD published a set of 83 patches to be merged into Linux kernel mainline 3.17 for supporting their Graphics Core Next-based Radeon graphics cards. The so-called HSA kernel driver resides in the directory /drivers/gpu/hsa, while the DRM graphics device drivers reside in /drivers/gpu/drm and augment the already existing DRM drivers for Radeon cards. This very first implementation focuses on a single "Kaveri" APU and works alongside the existing Radeon kernel graphics driver (kgd).

=== Hardware schedulers ===
Hardware schedulers are used to perform scheduling and offload the assignment of compute queues to the ACEs from the driver to hardware, by buffering these queues until there is at least one empty queue in at least one ACE. This causes the HWS to immediately assign buffered queues to the ACEs until all queues are full or there are no more queues to safely assign.

Part of the scheduling work performed includes prioritized queues which allow critical tasks to run at a higher priority than other tasks without requiring the lower priority tasks to be preempted to run the high priority task, therefore allowing the tasks to run concurrently with the high priority tasks scheduled to hog the GPU as much as possible while letting other tasks use the resources that the high priority tasks are not using. These are essentially Asynchronous Compute Engines that lack dispatch controllers. They were first introduced in the fourth generation GCN microarchitecture, but were present in the third generation GCN microarchitecture for internal testing purposes. A driver update has enabled the hardware schedulers in third generation GCN parts for production use.

=== Primitive Discard Accelerator ===
This unit discards degenerate triangles before they enter the vertex shader and triangles that do not cover any fragments before they enter the fragment shader. This unit was introduced with the fourth generation GCN microarchitecture.

== Generations ==
=== Graphics Core Next 1 ===
AMD Graphics Core Next 1
- Release date: January 2012; 14 years ago

History
- Predecessor: TeraScale 3
- Successor: Graphics Core Next 2

Support status
- Unsupported since mid-2022 (final Windows driver version 22.6.1 for Windows 7 and 10)

The GCN 1 microarchitecture was used in several Radeon HD 7000 series graphics cards.

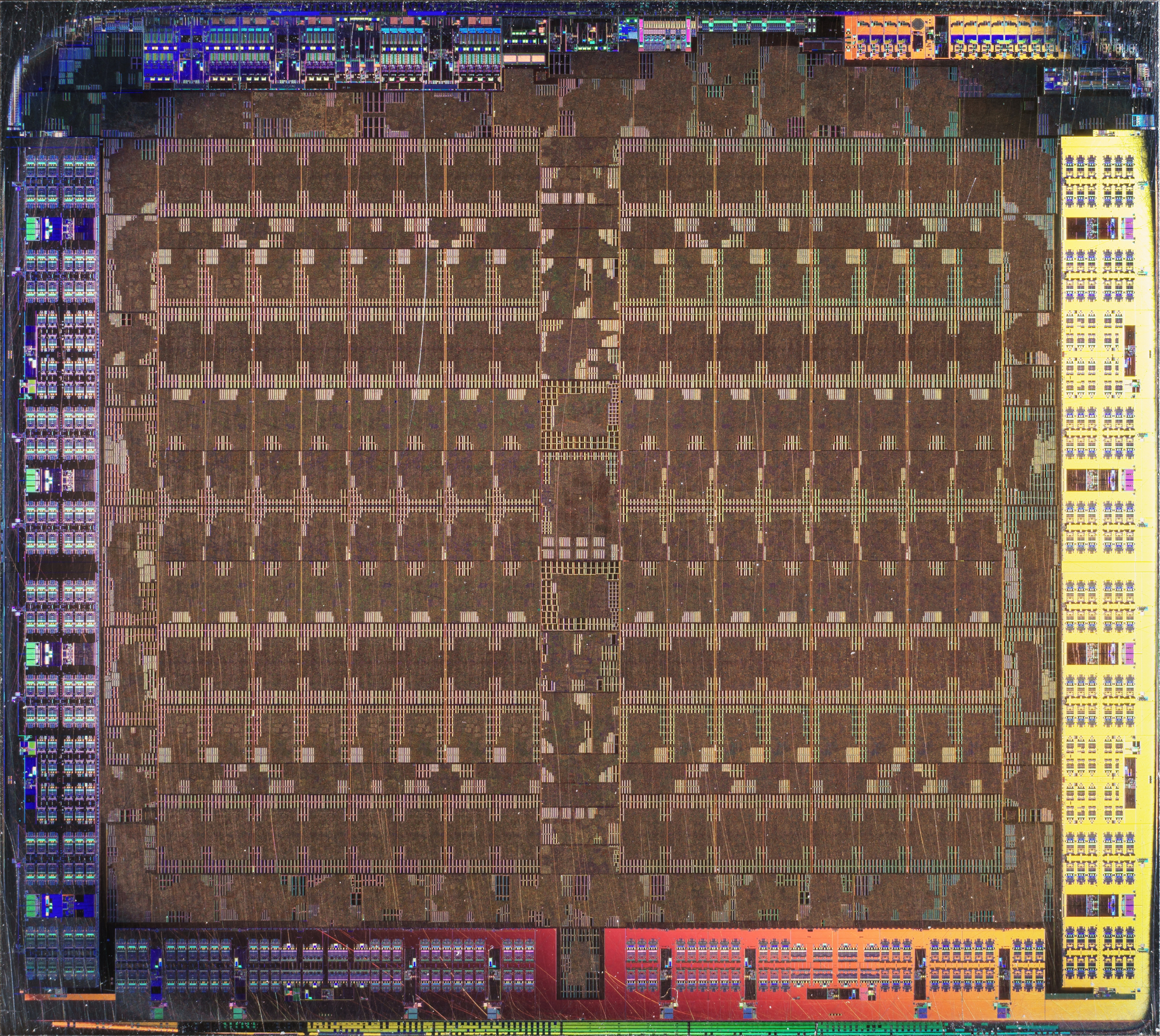
Die shot of the Tahiti GPU used in Radeon HD 7950 GHz Edition graphics cards

- support for 64-bit addressing (x86-64 address space) with unified address space for CPU and GPU
  - support for PCIe 3.0
  - GPU sends interrupt requests to CPU on various events (such as page faults)
- support for Partially Resident Textures, which enable virtual memory support through DirectX and OpenGL extensions
- AMD PowerTune support, which dynamically adjusts performance to stay within a specific TDP
- support for Mantle (API), Vulkan and OpenGL 4.6

There are Asynchronous Compute Engines controlling computation and dispatching.

==== ZeroCore Power ====
ZeroCore Power is a long idle power saving technology, shutting off functional units of the GPU when not in use. AMD ZeroCore Power technology supplements AMD PowerTune.

==== Chips ====
Discrete GPUs (Southern Islands family):

- Hainan
- Oland
- Cape Verde
- Pitcairn
- Tahiti

=== Graphics Core Next 2 ===
AMD Graphics Core Next 2
- Release date: September 2013; 13 years ago

History
- Predecessor: Graphics Core Next 1
- Successor: Graphics Core Next 3

Support status
- Unsupported since mid-2022 (final Windows driver version 22.6.1 for Windows 7 and 10)

AMD PowerTune "Bonaire"

Die shot of the Hawaii GPU used in Radeon R9 290 graphics cards

The 2nd generation of GCN was introduced with the Radeon HD 7790 and is also found in the Radeon HD 8770, R7 260/260X, R9 290/290X, R9 295X2, R7 360, and R9 390/390X, as well as Steamroller-based desktop "Kaveri" APUs and mobile "Kaveri" APUs and in the Puma-based "Beema" and "Mullins" APUs. It has multiple advantages over the original GCN, including FreeSync support, AMD TrueAudio and a revised version of AMD PowerTune technology.

GCN 2nd generation introduced an entity called "Shader Engine" (SE). A Shader Engine comprises one geometry processor, up to 44 CUs (Hawaii chip), rasterizers, ROPs, and L1 cache. Not part of a Shader Engine is the Graphics Command Processor, the 8 ACEs, the L2 cache and memory controllers as well as the audio and video accelerators, the display controllers, the 2 DMA controllers and the PCIe interface.

The A10-7850K "Kaveri" contains 8 CUs (compute units) and 8 Asynchronous Compute Engines for independent scheduling and work item dispatching.

At AMD Developer Summit (APU) in November 2013 Michael Mantor presented the Radeon R9 290X.

==== Chips ====
Discrete GPUs (Sea Islands family):

- Bonaire
- Hawaii

integrated into APUs:

- Temash
- Kabini
- Liverpool (i.e. the APU found in the PlayStation 4)
- Durango (i.e. the APU found in the Xbox One and Xbox One S)
- Kaveri
- Godavari
- Mullins
- Beema
- Carrizo-L

=== Graphics Core Next 3 ===
AMD Graphics Core Next 3
- Release date: June 2015; 11 years ago

History
- Predecessor: Graphics Core Next 2
- Successor: Graphics Core Next 4

Support status
- Supported, with less regular Windows driver update schedule

Die shot of the Fiji GPU used in Radeon R9 Nano graphics cards

GCN 3rd generation was introduced in 2014 with the Radeon R9 285 and R9 M295X, which have the "Tonga" GPU. It features improved tessellation performance, lossless delta color compression to reduce memory bandwidth usage, an updated and more efficient instruction set, a new high quality scaler for video, HEVC encoding (VCE 3.0) and HEVC decoding (UVD 6.0), and a new multimedia engine (video encoder/decoder). Delta color compression is supported in Mesa. However, its double precision performance is worse compared to previous generation.

==== Chips ====
discrete GPUs:

- Tonga (Volcanic Islands family), comes with UVD 5.0 (Unified Video Decoder)
- Fiji (Pirate Islands family), comes with UVD 6.0 and High Bandwidth Memory (HBM 1)

integrated into APUs:

- Carrizo, comes with UVD 6.0
- Bristol Ridge
- Stoney Ridge

=== Graphics Core Next 4 ===
AMD Graphics Core Next 4
- Release date: June 2016; 10 years ago

History
- Predecessor: Graphics Core Next 3
- Successor: Graphics Core Next 5

Support status
- Supported, with less regular Windows driver update schedule

Die shot of the Polaris 11 GPU used in Radeon RX 460 graphics cards

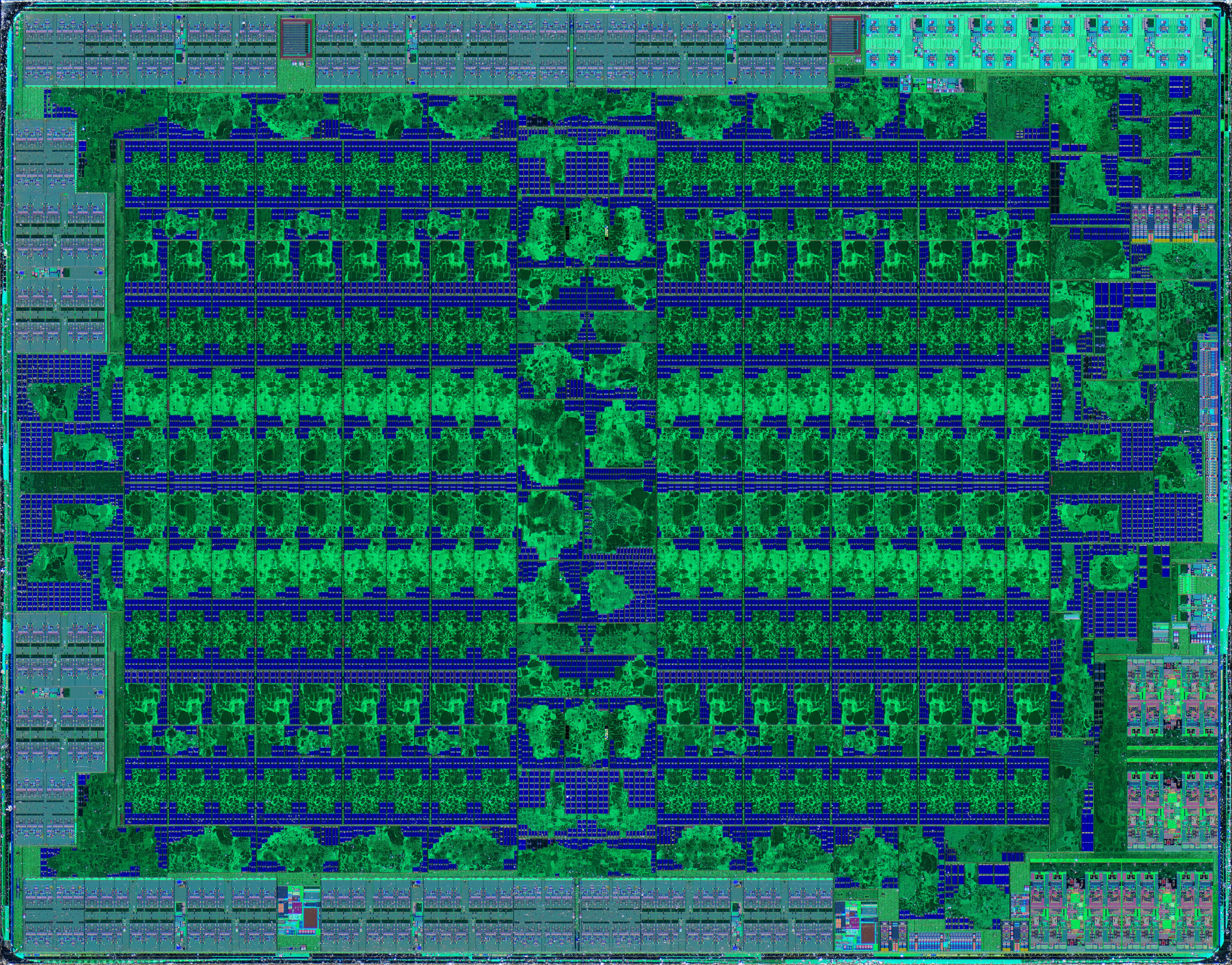
Die shot of the Polaris 10 GPU used in Radeon RX 470 graphics cards

GPUs of the Arctic Islands-family were introduced in Q2 of 2016 with the AMD Radeon 400 series. The 3D-engine (i.e. GCA (Graphics and Compute array) or GFX) is identical to that found in the Tonga-chips. But Polaris feature a newer Display Controller engine, UVD version 6.3, etc.

All Polaris-based chips other than the Polaris 30 are produced on the 14 nm FinFET process, developed by Samsung Electronics and licensed to GlobalFoundries. The slightly newer refreshed Polaris 30 is built on the 12 nm LP FinFET process node, developed by Samsung and GlobalFoundries. The fourth generation GCN instruction set architecture is compatible with the third generation. It is an optimization for 14 nm FinFET process enabling higher GPU clock speeds than with the 3rd GCN generation. Architectural improvements include new hardware schedulers, a new primitive discard accelerator, a new display controller, and an updated UVD that can decode HEVC at 4K resolutions at 60 frames per second with 10 bits per color channel.

==== Chips ====
discrete GPUs:

- Polaris 10 (also codenamed Ellesmere) found on "Radeon RX 470" and "Radeon RX 480"-branded graphics cards
- Polaris 11 (also codenamed Baffin) found on "Radeon RX 460"-branded graphics cards (also Radeon RX 560D)
- Polaris 12 (also codenamed Lexa) found on "Radeon RX 550" and "Radeon RX 540"-branded graphics cards
- Polaris 20, which is a refreshed (14 nm LPP Samsung/GloFo FinFET process) Polaris 10 with higher clocks, used for "Radeon RX 570" and "Radeon RX 580"-branded graphics cards
- Polaris 21, which is a refreshed (14 nm LPP Samsung/GloFo FinFET process) Polaris 11, used for "Radeon RX 560"-branded graphics cards
- Polaris 22, found on "Radeon RX Vega M GH" and "Radeon RX Vega M GL"-branded graphics cards (as part of Kaby Lake-G)
- Polaris 23, which is a refreshed (14 nm LPP Samsung/GloFo FinFET process) Polaris 12, used for "Radeon Pro WX 3200" and "Radeon RX 540X"-branded graphics cards (also Radeon RX 640)
- Polaris 30, which is a refreshed (12 nm LP GloFo FinFET process) Polaris 20 with higher clocks, used for "Radeon RX 590"-branded graphics cards

In addition to dedicated GPUs, Polaris is utilized in the APUs of the PlayStation 4 Pro and Xbox One X, titled "Neo" and "Scorpio", respectively.

==== Precision Performance ====
FP64 performance of all GCN 4th generation GPUs is ^{1}/_{16} of FP32 performance.

=== Graphics Core Next 5 ===
AMD Graphics Core Next 5
- Release date: June 2017; 9 years ago

History
- Predecessor: Graphics Core Next 4
- Successor: CDNA 1, RDNA 1

Support status
- Supported, with less regular Windows driver update schedule

Die shot of the Vega 10 GPU used in Radeon RX Vega 64 graphics cards

AMD began releasing details of their next generation of GCN Architecture, termed the 'Next-Generation Compute Unit', in January 2017. The new design was expected to increase instructions per clock, higher clock speeds, support for HBM2, a larger memory address space. The discrete graphics chipsets also include "HBCC (High Bandwidth Cache Controller)", but not when integrated into APUs. Additionally, the new chips were expected to include improvements in the Rasterisation and Render output units. The stream processors are heavily modified from the previous generations to support packed math Rapid Pack Math technology for 8-bit, 16-bit, and 32-bit numbers. With this there is a significant performance advantage when lower precision is acceptable (for example: processing two half-precision numbers at the same rate as a single single precision number).

Nvidia introduced tile-based rasterization and binning with Maxwell, and this was a big reason for Maxwell's efficiency increase. In January, AnandTech assumed that Vega would finally catch up with Nvidia regarding energy efficiency optimizations due to the new "DSBR (Draw Stream Binning Rasterizer)" to be introduced with Vega.

It also added support for a new shader stage – Primitive Shaders. Primitive shaders provide more flexible geometry processing and replace the vertex and geometry shaders in a rendering pipeline. As of December 2018, the Primitive shaders can't be used because required API changes are yet to be done.

Vega 10 and Vega 12 use the 14 nm FinFET process, developed by Samsung Electronics and licensed to GlobalFoundries. Vega 20 uses the 7 nm FinFET process developed by TSMC.

==== Chips ====
discrete GPUs:

- Vega 10 (14 nm Samsung/GloFo FinFET process) (also codenamed Greenland) found on "Radeon RX Vega 64", "Radeon RX Vega 56", "Radeon Vega Frontier Edition", "Radeon Pro V340", Radeon Pro WX 9100, and Radeon Pro WX 8200 graphics cards
- Vega 12 (14 nm Samsung/GloFo FinFET process) found on "Radeon Pro Vega 20" and "Radeon Pro Vega 16"-branded mobile graphics cards
- Vega 20 (7 nm TSMC FinFET process) found on "Radeon Instinct MI50" and "Radeon Instinct MI60"-branded accelerator cards, "Radeon Pro Vega II", and "Radeon VII"-branded graphics cards.

integrated into APUs:

- Raven Ridge came with VCN 1 which supersedes VCE and UVD and allows full fixed-function VP9 decode.
- Picasso
- Renoir
- Cezanne

==== Precision performance ====
Double-precision floating-point (FP64) performance of all GCN 5th generation GPUs, except for Vega 20, is one-sixteenth of FP32 performance. For Vega 20 with Radeon Instinct this is half of FP32 performance. For Vega 20 with Radeon VII this is a quarter of FP32 performance. All GCN 5th generation GPUs support half-precision floating-point (FP16) calculations which is twice of FP32 performance.

== Comparison of GCN GPUs ==
- Table contains only discrete GPUs (including mobile). APU(IGP) and console SoCs are not listed.

Generation	GCN 1 (Note: "AMD Radeon HD 7970" (Tahiti XT), "AMD Radeon HD 7870" (Pitcairn XT), "AMD Radeon HD 7770" (Cape Verde XT) are given as examples of "GCN" GPUs in AMD Graphics Cores Next (GCN) Architecture on page 13-15.)					GCN 2		GCN 3 (Note: "Tonga", "Fiji", and "Antigua" are explicitly mentioned as examples of "3rd-generation GCN solutions" in Radeon: Dissecting the Polaris Architecture on page 9.)			GCN 4				GCN 5		
Series (Family)	Southern Islands					Sea Islands		Volcanic Islands			Arctic Islands				Vega		Vega 7nm
Die	Tahiti	Pitcairn	Cape Verde	Oland	Hainan	Bonaire	Hawaii	Topaz	Tonga	Fiji	Ellesmere	Baffin	Lexa	VegaM	Vega 10	Vega 12	Vega 20
Code name (Note: Old code names such as Treasure (Lexa) or Hawaii Refresh (Ellesmere) are not listed.)	?	?	?	Tiran	?	?	Ibiza	Iceland	?	?	Polaris 10	Polaris 11	Polaris 12	Polaris 22	Greenland	Treasure Refresh	Moonshot
Variant(s)	New Zealand; Malta	Wimbledon; Curaçao; Neptune; Trinidad	Chelsea; Heathrow; Venus; Tropo	Mars; Opal; Litho	Sun; Jet; Exo; Banks	Saturn; Tobago; Strato; Emerald	Vesuvius; Grenada	Meso; Weston; Polaris 24	Amethyst; Antigua	Capsaicin	Polaris 21	Polaris 23	—N/a	—N/a	—N/a	—N/a	—N/a
Fab	TSMC 28 nm										GlobalFoundries 14 nm / 12 nm (Polaris 30)						TSMC 7 nm
Die size (mm^{2})	352 / 365 (Malta)	212	123	77	56	160	438	125	366	596	232	123	103	208	495	~250	331
Transistors (million)	4,313	2,800	1,500	950	690	2,080	6,200	1,550	5,000	8,900	5,700	3,000	2,200	5,000	12,500	Unknown	13,230
Transistor density (MTr/mm^{2})	12.3 / 12.8 (Malta)	13.2	12.2	12.3		13.0	14.2	12.4	13.7	14.9	24.6	24.4	21.4	24.0	25.3	Unknown	40.0
Asynchronous compute engines	2						8	?	8		4						
Geometry engines	2		1			2	—N/a	?	—N/a						4	2	4
Shader engines	—N/a						4	?	4			2		4	—N/a		
Hardware schedulers	—N/a										2						
Compute units	32	20	10 / 8 (Chelsea)	6	5 / 6 (Jet)	14	44	6	32	64	36	16	10	24	64	20	64
Stream processors	2048	1280	640 / 512 (Chelsea)	384	320 / 384 (Jet)	896	2816	384	2048	4096	2304	1024	640	1536	4096	1280	4096
Texture mapping units	128	80	40 / 32 (Chelsea)	24	20 / 24 (Jet)	56	176	24	128	256	144	64	40	96	256	80	256
Render output units	32		16	8		16	64	8	32	64	32	16		64		32	64
Z/Stencil OPS	128		64	16		64	256	16	128	256	—N/a						
L1 cache (KB)	16 per Compute unit (CU)																
L2 cache (KB)	768	512	256		128 / 256 (Jet)	256	1024	256	768	2048		1024	512	1024	4096	1024	4096
Display Core Engine	6.0			6.4	—N/a	8.2	8.5	—N/a	10.0		11.2				12.0		12.1
Unified Video Decoder	3.2	4.0			—N/a	4.2		—N/a	5.0	6.0	6.3				7.0		7.2
Video Coding Engine	1.0				—N/a	2.0		—N/a	3.0		3.4				4.0		4.1
Launch (Note: Initial launch date. Launch dates of variant chips such as Polaris 20 (April 2017) are not listed.)	Dec 2011	Mar 2012	Feb 2012	Jan 2013	May 2015	Mar 2013	Oct 2013	2014	Aug 2014	Jun 2015	Jun 2016	Aug 2016	Apr 2017	Feb 2018	Jun 2017	Nov 2018	Nov 2018
Notes					mobile/OEM			mobile/OEM						mobile/OEM		mobile	

== See also ==
- List of AMD graphics processing units
- RDNA (microarchitecture), GCN's successor launched in 2019
