= AMD APP SDK =

Software development kit

- Original author(s): Advanced Micro Devices
- Final release: 3.0 (3.0.130 Linux) / August 25, 2015; 9 years ago
- Preview release: 3.0 Beta / December 9, 2014; 10 years ago
- Operating system: Linux, Microsoft Windows
- Type: software development kit
- Website: web.archive.org/web/20170628060105/https://developer.amd.com/amd-accelerated-parallel-processing-app-sdk (downloads do not function)

The entropy encode from the VCE ASIC can be utilized with the help of AMD APP SDK.

AMD APP SDK is a software development kit by AMD for "Accelerated Parallel Processing" (APP). AMD APP SDK also targets Heterogeneous System Architecture (not only GPU).

AMD APP SDK was available for 32-bit and 64-bit versions of Microsoft Windows and Linux but was removed from AMD's official website. A developer stated in a forum post that the SDK was discontinued as the required libraries are now included with the drivers.

AMD intends developers to employ AMD APP SDK to utilize Video Coding Engine hybrid mode to create hybrid encoders that pair custom motion estimation, inverse discrete cosine transform and motion compensation with the hardware entropy encoding to achieve faster than real-time encoding.

The AMD APP SDK v3.0 supports OpenCL 2.0 and Catalyst Omega 15.7 driver, also it includes samples for OpenCL as well as accelerated libraries such as Bolt (an open-source C++ template library) and the OpenCL accelerated OpenCV (Open Computer Vision) library. This last version can be downloaded with the aid of StackOverflow.

== History ==
AMD APP SDK replaced AMD Stream SDK (formerly named ATI Stream SDK). AMD CAL (Compute Abstraction Layer) SDK was replaced by ATI Stream SDK, available for Microsoft Windows and Linux, 32-bit and 64-bit. As of February 2021, there are few signs on the AMD official web site that AMD APP SDK ever existed.
