= HSA Foundation =

- Founded: June 2012
- Type: Not-for-profit engineering organization
- Members: 53
- Website: www.hsafoundation.com

The HSA Foundation is a not-for-profit engineering organization of industry and academia that works on the development of the Heterogeneous System Architecture (HSA), a set of royalty-free computer hardware specifications, as well as open source software development tools needed to use HSA features in application software.

The HSA Foundation aims to develop and define features and interfaces for various types of computer processors, including CPUs, graphics processors, DSPs; as well as the memory systems that connect these. The resulting architecture, HSA, aims to make it easier to program parallel systems built from heterogeneous combinations of these devices.

The HSA Foundation was founded by AMD, ARM Holdings, Imagination Technologies, MediaTek, Qualcomm, Samsung and Texas Instruments. Further members include licensors and licensees of semiconductor intellectual property, developers of CPUs, GPUs, DSPs and application-specific integrated circuits (ASICs) based upon own and/or licensed technology, academic partners such as the Lawrence Livermore National Laboratory and the University of Bologna, and the not-for-profit engineering organization Linaro. The HSA Foundation has itself joined the Linux Foundation.

HSA Foundation engineering works with upstream projects on a set of requirements that are determined by the Technical Steering Committee.

== Members ==
Founding

- Advanced Micro Devices
- Arm Ltd.
- Imagination Technologies
- MediaTek
- Samsung Electronics
- Texas Instruments

Later

- Analog Devices
- Argonne National Laboratory
- Arteris
- University of Bristol
- Broadcom Corporation
- Canonical (company)
- Ceva (semiconductor company)
- Codeplay
- University of Illinois Department of Computer Science
- School of Informatics, University of Edinburgh
- Huawei
- Industrial Technology Research Institute
- Lawrence Livermore National Laboratory
- LG Electronics
- Linaro
- N.M.A.M. Institute of Technology
- National Tsing Hua University
- Northeastern University
- Oak Ridge National Laboratory
- Oracle Corporation
- S3 Graphics
- STMicroelectronics
- Synopsys
- University of Tampere
- Tensilica
- Tsinghua University
- University of Bologna
- VIA Technologies
- Vivante Corporation
