= LGA 4094 =

LGA 4094 may refer to four physically identical but electrically incompatible CPU sockets for AMD processors:

- Socket SP3, an AMD server processor socket for Epyc-branded CPUs.
- Socket TR4, or Socket SP3r2, an AMD desktop processor socket for first- and second-generation Ryzen Threadripper-branded CPUs
- Socket sTRX4, or Socket SP3r3, an AMD desktop processor socket for third-generation Ryzen Threadripper-branded CPUs
- Socket sWRX8, or Socket SP3r4, an AMD desktop processor socket for third- and fourth-generation Ryzen Threadripper Pro-branded CPUs
