= Land grid array =

Type of surface-mount packaging for integrated circuits

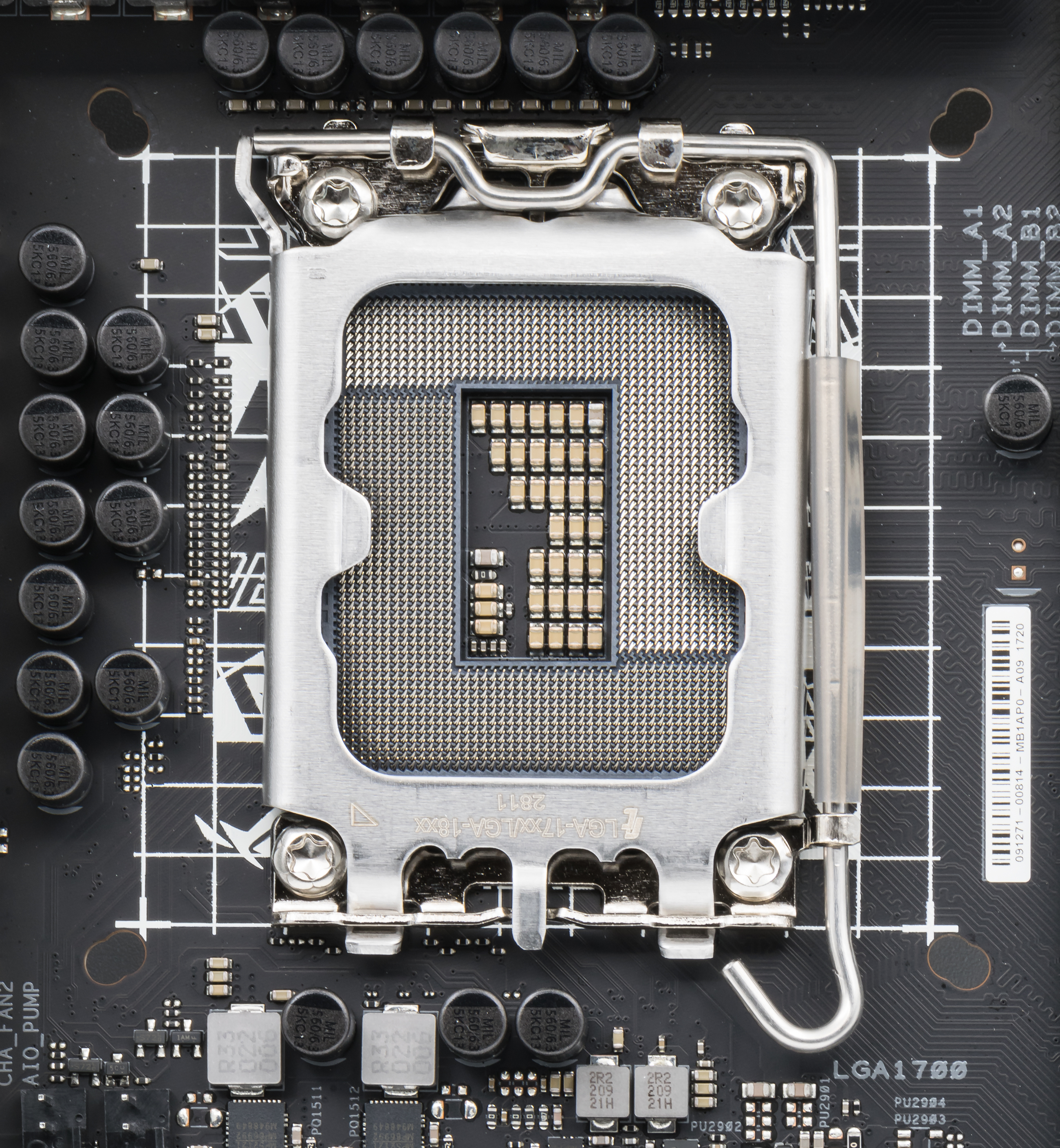
LGA 1700 socket on a motherboard

The land grid array (LGA) is a type of surface-mount packaging for integrated circuits (ICs) that is notable for having the pins on the socket (when a socket is used) — as opposed to pins on the integrated circuit, known as a pin grid array (PGA). An LGA can be electrically connected to a printed circuit board (PCB) either by the use of a socket or by soldering directly to the board.

== Description ==
The land grid array is a packaging technology with a grid of contacts, 'lands', on the underside of a package. The contacts are to be connected to a grid of contacts on the PCB. Not all rows and columns of the grid need to be used. The contacts can either be connected by using an LGA socket, or by surface-mount soldering using solder paste. The grid elements found in use can be e.g. circular, triangular or other polygonal shapes and might even have different sizes. Grids might sometimes appear like honeycomb patterns. Designs are often optimized for factors like contact likeliness despite tolerances, electrical gap to neighboring contacts and for allowing best shapes for counterpart spring contacts including their outgoing electric connectivity to e.g. a backplane PCB.

LGA packaging is related to ball grid array (BGA) and pin grid array (PGA) packaging. Like pin grid arrays, land grid array packages are designed to fit either in a socket or be soldered directly to a circuit board, although PGA packages cannot be soldered using surface mount technology. In contrast with a BGA, land grid array packages in unsocketed configurations have no balls, and use flat contacts which are soldered directly to the PCB.

== Use in microprocessors ==
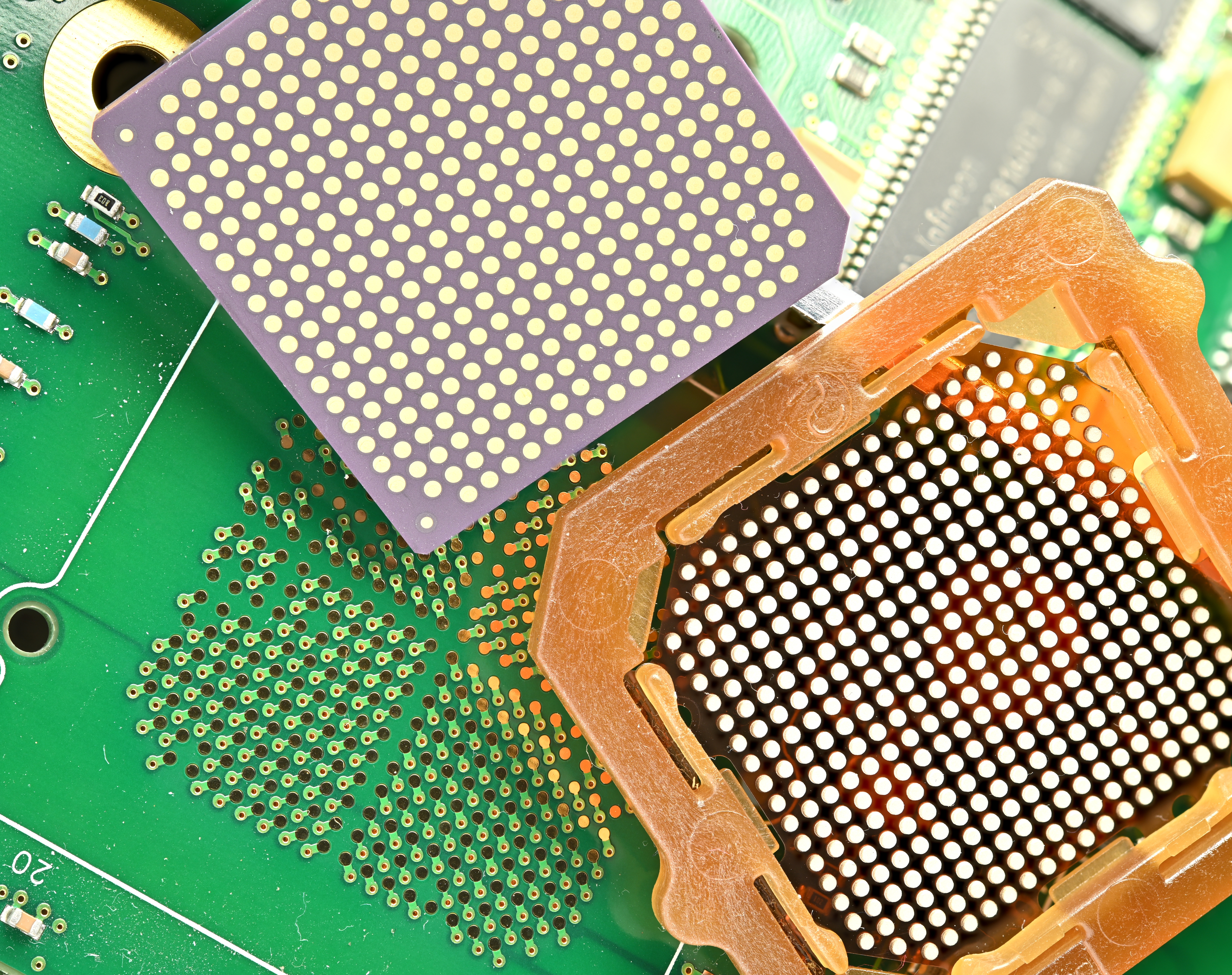
Ceramic LGA package (top), with interposer containing conductive columns (right) and matching LGA pads on the PCB (lower left)

LGA has been used for high-end microprocessors and similar applications since the 1990s, primarily in Unix workstations. These early uses predate the availability of modern LGA sockets, and instead used land grid arrays on both the processor package and the motherboard. An array of slightly compressible conductive columns held in a frame is then sandwiched between the two LGA surfaces and compressed using the heatsink. This was considered field upgradable by technicians at the time. Care had to be taken to not touch the conductive columns to avoid contamination.

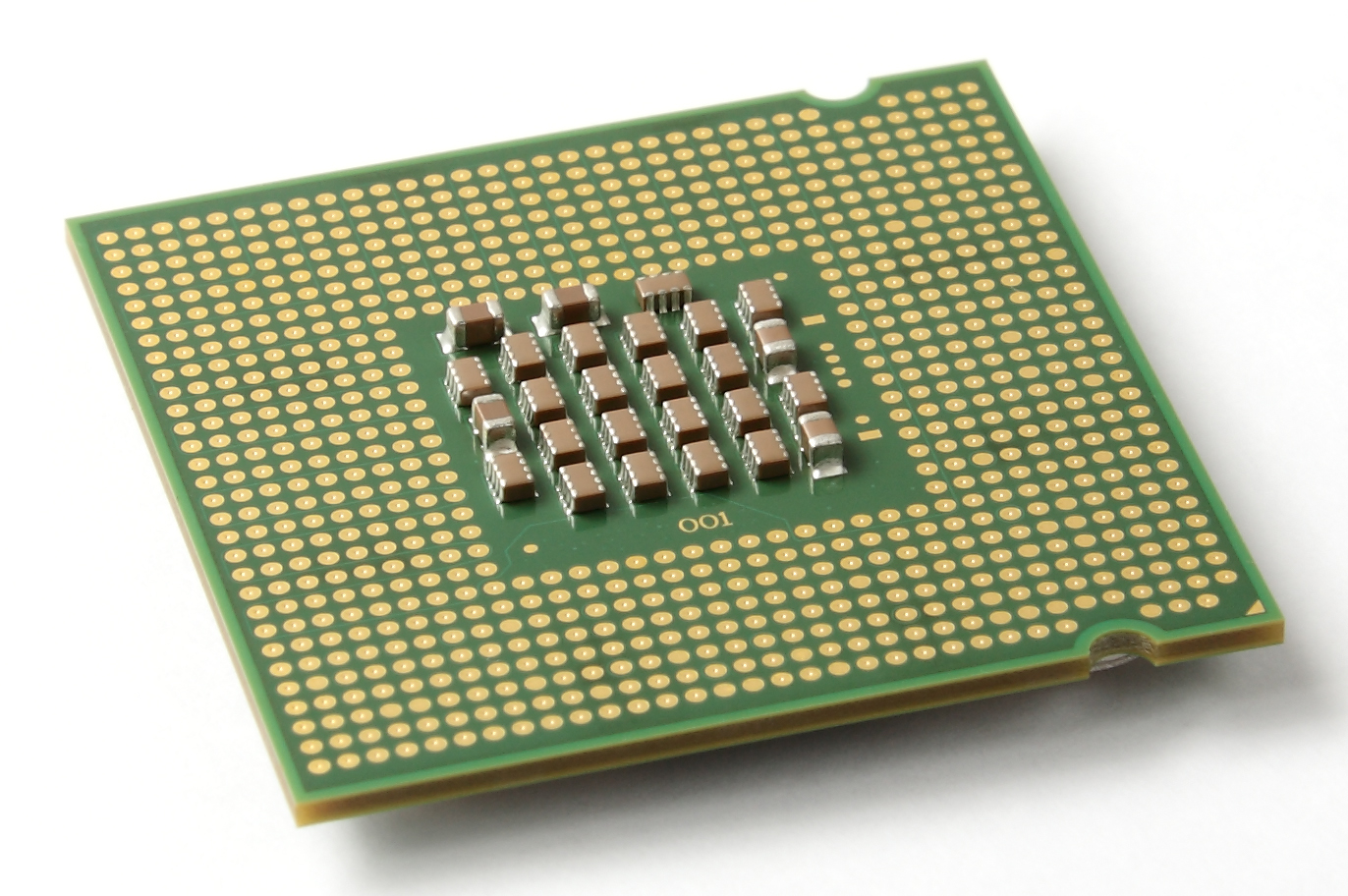
The LGA 775 package of a Pentium 4 Prescott CPU

Installing a CPU with LGA socket

LGA is currently used as a physical interface for microprocessors of the Intel Pentium, Intel Xeon, Intel Core and AMD Opteron, Threadripper, Epyc, and newer Ryzen families. Unlike the pin grid array (PGA) interface found on older Intel and AMD desktop processors, there are no pins on the chip; in place of the pins are pads of bare gold-plated copper that touch protruding pins on the microprocessor's socket on the motherboard. Compared to PGA CPUs, LGA reduces the likelihood of the chip being damaged either before or during installation as there are no pins that can be accidentally bent. By transferring the pins to the motherboard, it is possible to design the socket to physically shield the pins from damage, and the costs of installation damage can be mitigated as motherboards tend to be significantly cheaper than CPUs.

While LGA sockets have been in use as early as 1996 by the MIPS R10000, HP PA-8000, and Sun UltraSPARC II processors, the interface did not gain mainstream use until Intel introduced their LGA platform, starting with the 5x0 and 6x0 sequence Pentium 4 (Prescott) in 2004. All Pentium D and Core 2 desktop processors use LGA 775 socket. As of Q1 2006, Intel switched the Xeon server platform to LGA, starting with the 5000-series models. AMD introduced their server LGA platform starting with the 2000-series Opteron in Q2 2006. AMD offered the Athlon 64 FX series on socket 1207FX through ASUS's L1N64-SLI WS motherboards. It was the only desktop LGA solution offered by AMD at the time until the release of Socket AM5 in 2022.

The most recent Intel desktop LGA socket is dubbed LGA 1851 (Socket V1), which is used with Intel's Arrow Lake series Core Ultra 5, 7, and 9 families. Their Skylake-X Core i7 and Core i9 families use the LGA 2066 socket. The LGA setup provides higher pin densities, allowing more power contacts and thus a more stable power supply to the chip.

AMD introduced its first consumer LGA socket, called Socket TR4 (LGA 4094) for its high end desktop platform Ryzen Threadripper processors. This socket is physically identical to their Socket SP3 for their Epyc server CPUs even though SP3 CPUs are not compatible with the desktop X399 chipset and vice versa.

The previous AMD server LGA socket was designated Socket G34 (LGA 1944). Like Intel, AMD decided to use LGA sockets for their higher pin densities, as a 1944-pin PGA would simply be too large for most motherboards.

=== AMD ===
- Socket F (LGA 1207)
- Socket C32 (LGA 1207) (replaces Socket F)
- Socket G34 (LGA 1944)
- Socket SP3 (LGA 4094)
- Socket TR4 (LGA 4094)
- Socket sTRX4 (LGA 4094)
- Socket sWRX8 (LGA 4094)
- Socket AM5 (LGA 1718)
- Socket SP5 (LGA 6096)
- Socket SP6 (LGA 4844)
- Socket sTR5 (LGA 4844)

=== Intel ===
- LGA 771 (Socket J) – Note that Socket 771 is the server counterpart of LGA 775 and with a bus compatible motherboard, an adapter for LGA 775 to LGA 771 can be used to get a Xeon on a consumer motherboard with Socket 775.
- LGA 775 (Socket T)
- LGA 1366 (Socket B)
- LGA 1356 (Socket B2)
- LGA 1156 (Socket H)
- LGA 1155 (Socket H2)
- LGA 1150 (Socket H3)
- LGA 1151 (Socket H4) – note that two discrete revisions of LGA 1151 exist; the first revision is only compatible with Skylake and Kaby Lake CPUs while the second revision is only compatible with Coffee Lake CPUs.
- LGA 1200 (Socket H5)
- LGA 1700 (Socket V)
- LGA 1851 (Socket V1)
- LGA 1954 (Codename "NVL-S") – note that it is an upcoming socket.
- LGA 2011 (Socket R)
- LGA 2011-1 (Socket R2) - Used exclusively for Intel Xeon E7 branded server processors using the Ivy Bridge-E, Haswell-E, and Broadwell-E Microarchitectures. It is incompatible with LGA 2011 and LGA 2011-3
- LGA 2011-3 (Socket R3) – note that LGA 2011-3 is incompatible with LGA 2011 and is used for Haswell-E and Broadwell-E Intel Core i7 extreme processors and the Intel X99 chipset. It does, however have the same pin count and design as LGA 2011. Also used for Xeon E5 processors and Intel C612 chipset.
- LGA 2066 (Socket R4) – for Intel's X299 Chipset and i5, i7 and i9 X processors from Skylake-X and Kaby Lake-X lines. There are Xeons also available for this socket.
- LGA 3647 (Socket P, also P0 and P1) – two mechanically incompatible versions for different products, 6ch memory
- LGA 4189 (Socket P+) - Intel Xeon Scalable (Ice Lake-SP) socket, 8ch memory
- LGA 4677 (Socket E) - Intel Xeon Scalable (Sapphire Rapids and Emerald Rapids) socket
- LGA 7529 - Intel E-core Xeon (Sierra Forest) socket

== See also ==
- Chip carrier
- Dual in-line package (DIP)
- Pin grid array (PGA)
- Ball grid array (BGA)
- Compression Attached Memory Module (CAMM), a memory module form factor using a land grid array connection
