= SP6 =

SP6 may refer to:

- SP6 RNA polymerase, a RNA polymerase related to the T7 RNA polymerase
- one of the three versions of the 9x39 mm rifle cartridge
- a model of steam toy made by British manufacturer Mamod
- Service pack 6 in computing
- 4685 Karetnikov (1978 SP6), a Main-belt Asteroid discovered on September 27, 1978
- 9154 Kolʹtsovo (1982 SP6), a Main-belt Asteroid discovered on September 16, 1982
- Spleen 6, an acupuncture point above the ankle on the inside of the leg.
- Specialist 6, an obsolete enlisted rank in the United States Army. See Specialist (rank).
- Surface Pro 6, a 2-in-1 detachable tablet computer developed by Microsoft
- Socket SP6, a CPU socket for AMD server CPUs
