= Socket sWRX8 =

CPU socket for AMD workstation CPUs

- Type: LGA-ZIF
- Chip form factors: Flip-chip
- Contacts: 4,094
- FSB protocol: PCI Express, Infinity Fabric
- Processor dimensions: 58.5mm x 75.4mm 4410.9 mm^{2}
- Processors: Ryzen Threadripper PRO: Castle Peak; Chagall
- Variant: sTRX4 (SP3r3)
- Successor: sTR5
- Memory support: DDR4
- This article is part of the CPU socket series

Socket sWRX8, also known as Socket SP3r4, is a land grid array (LGA) CPU socket designed by AMD supporting its Ryzen Threadripper Pro 3000 and 5000 series workstation processors, which are based on Zen 2 and Zen 3 platforms, respectively. It was initially launched in July 2020 for OEMs only, with retail availability coming later in March 2021.

Socket sWRX8 does not succeed any previous sockets; instead it sits alongside socket sTRX4 as a socket for professional workstation computers, while sTRX4 is for consumer high-end desktop (HEDT) computers. sWRX8 has support for octa-channel DDR4 memory and 128 PCIe 4.0 lanes from the CPU, whereas sTRX4 only supports quad-channel DDR4 and 64 PCIe 4.0 lanes. Furthermore, unlike sTRX4, it supports RDIMM, LRDIMM and 3DS RDIMM memory types, allowing up to 2TB of RAM to be installed (compared to the maximum of 256GB for sTRX4).

It is physically identical to, but electrically incompatible with both sTRX4 and AMD's server socket SP3.

While Socket SP3 doesn't require a chipset, instead utilizing a system-on-a-chip design, Socket sWRX8 requires a chipset to provide improved connectivity and functionality. For Socket sWRX8, the WRX80 chipset was developed, which together with the CPU, provide a total of 152 PCIe 4.0 lanes. Also, like the TRX40 chipset, it does not feature a built-in High Definition Audio interface; instead motherboard manufacturers are including a separate audio controller onboard to provide audio functionality.

== See also ==
- Ryzen
- Socket sTRX4
- Socket TR4
- Socket SP3
