= Zen 3 =

2020 AMD 7-nanometer processor microarchitecture

AMD Zen 3

General information
- Launched: November 5, 2020; 5 years ago
- Designed by: AMD
- Common manufacturers: TSMC; GlobalFoundries
- CPUID code: Family 19h

Physical specifications
- Transistors: 6.24 billion (1× CCD) or 10.39 billion (2× CCD) (4.15 billion per 7 nm 8-core "CCD" & 2.09 billion for the 12 nm "I/O die")
- Cores: Desktop: 4 to 16; Workstation: 16 to 64; Server: 16 to 64
- Package: Package FP6
- Sockets: Socket AM4; Socket SP3; Socket sWRX8

Cache
- L1 cache: 64 KB (per core): 32 KB instructions; 32 KB data
- L2 cache: 512 KB (per core)
- L3 cache: 32 MB (per CCD); 96 MB (per CCD with 3D V-Cache); 16 MB (in APUs)

Architecture and classification
- Technology node: TSMC N7; TSMC N6
- Microarchitecture: Zen
- Instruction set: AMD64 (x86-64)
- Extensions: Crypto AES, SHA; SIMD MMX-plus, SSE, SSE2, SSE3, SSSE3, SSE4.1, SSE4.2, SSE4A, FMA3, AVX, AVX2

Products, models, variants
- Product code names: Desktop; Vermeer (w/o iGPU); Cézanne (APU); Chagall; Thin & Light Mobile; Cézanne; Barcelo; Barcelo-R; High-End Mobile Cézanne; Server; Milan; Milan-X

History
- Predecessor: Zen 2
- Successors: Zen 3+; Zen 4

Support status
- Supported

Zen 3 is the name for a CPU microarchitecture by AMD, released on November 5, 2020. It is the successor to Zen 2 and uses TSMC's 7 nm process for the chiplets and GlobalFoundries's 14 nm process for the I/O die on the server chips and 12 nm for desktop chips. Zen 3 powers Ryzen 5000 mainstream desktop processors (codenamed "Vermeer") and Epyc server processors (codenamed "Milan"). Zen 3 is supported on motherboards with 500 series chipsets; 400 series boards also saw support on select B450 / X470 motherboards with certain BIOSes. Zen 3 is the last microarchitecture before AMD switched to DDR5 memory and new sockets, which are AM5 for the desktop "Ryzen" chips alongside SP5 and SP6 for the EPYC server platform and sTRX8. According to AMD, Zen 3 has a 19% higher instructions per cycle (IPC) on average than Zen 2.

On April 1, 2022, AMD released the new Ryzen 6000 series for laptops/mobile, using an improved Zen 3+ architecture featuring notable architectural improvements to power efficiency and power management. And slightly later, on April 20, 2022, AMD would also release the Ryzen 7 5800X3D desktop processor, which increased gaming performance by around +15% on average by using for the very first time in a PC product, a 3D vertically stacked L3 cache. Specifically in the form of a 64MB L3 cache "3D V-Cache" die made on the same TSMC N7 process as the 8-core Zen 3 CCD which it gets direct copper to copper hybrid bonded to.

== Features ==
As the first largely "ground up redesign" of the Zen CPU core since the architecture family's original release in early 2017 with Zen 1/Ryzen 1000, Zen 3 was a significant architectural improvement over its predecessors; having a very significant IPC increase of +19% over the prior Zen 2 architecture in addition to being capable of reaching higher clock speeds.

Like Zen 2, Zen 3 is composed of up to 2 core complex dies (CCD) along with a separate IO die containing the I/O components. A Zen 3 CCD is composed of a single core complex (CCX) containing 8 CPU cores and 32 MB of shared L3 cache, this is in contrast to Zen 2 where each CCD is composed of 2 CCX, each containing 4 cores paired with 16 MB of L3 cache. The new configuration allows all 8 cores of the CCX to directly communicate with each other and the L3 Cache instead of having to use the IO die through the Infinity Fabric.

Zen 3 (along with AMD's RDNA2 GPUs) also implemented Resizable BAR, an optional feature introduced in PCIe 2.0, that was branded as Smart Access Memory (SAM). This technology allows CPU to directly access all of compatible video card's VRAM. Intel and Nvidia have since implemented this feature as well.

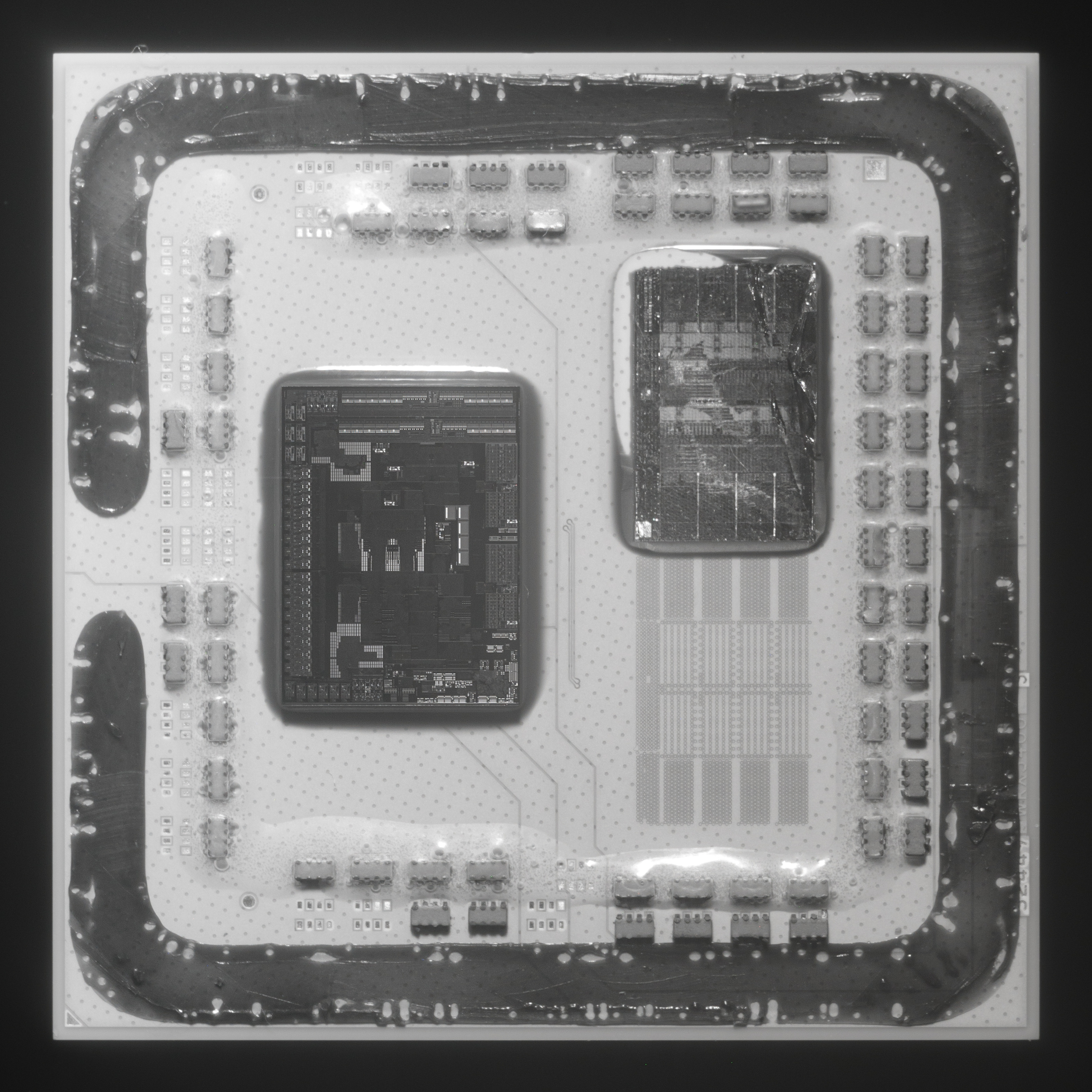
A de-lidded Ryzen 5 5600X. Only one 6-core CCD is present. The contacts for a second CCD are visible.

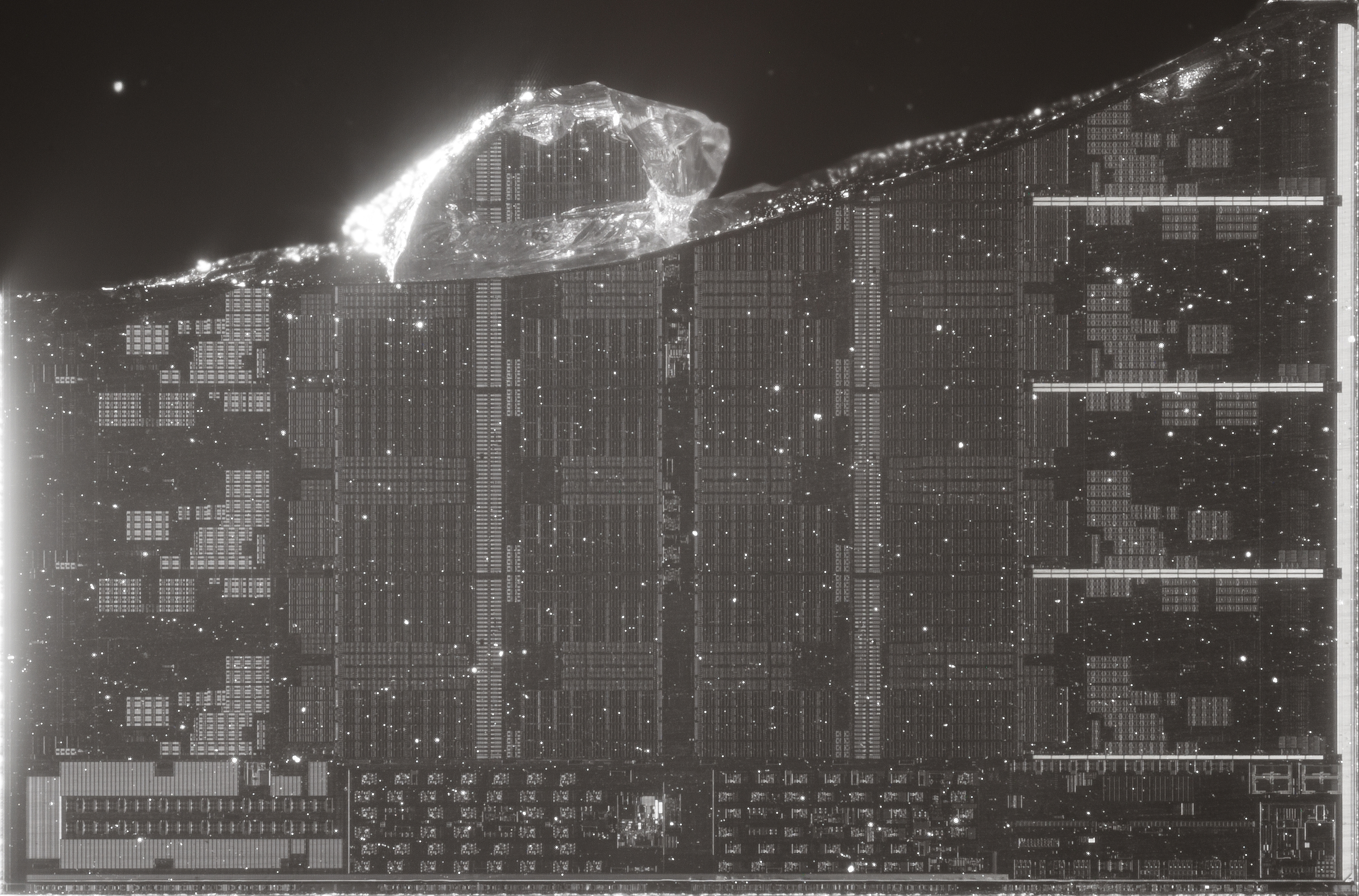
Close-up of the CCD, taken under infrared lighting. This die was damaged by the de-lidding process.

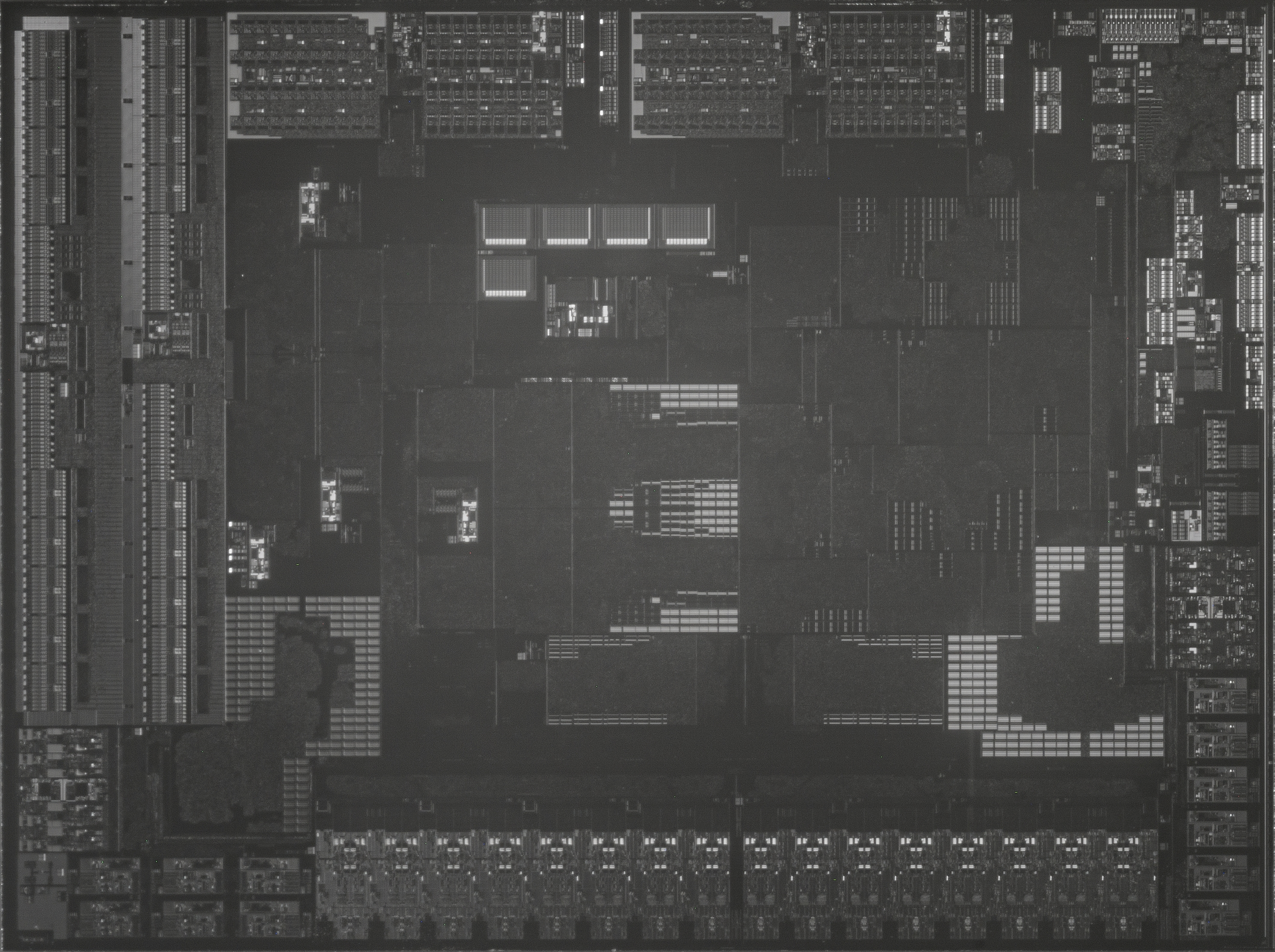
Close-up of the I/O die

In Zen 3, a single 32MB L3 cache pool is shared among all 8 cores in a chiplet, vs. Zen 2's two 16MB pools each shared among 4 cores in a core complex, of which there were two per chiplet. This new arrangement improves the cache hit rate as well as performance in situations that require cache data to be exchanged among cores, but increases cache latency from 39 cycles in Zen 2 to 46 clock cycles and halves per-core cache bandwidth, although both problems are partially mitigated by higher clock speeds. Total cache bandwidth on all 8 cores combined remains the same due to power consumption concerns. L2 cache capacity and latency remain the same at 512KB and 12 cycles. All cache read and write operations are done at 32 bytes per cycle.

On April 20, 2022, AMD released the R7 5800X3D. It features, for the first time in a desktop PC product, 3D-stacked vertical L3 cache. Its extra 64MB comes via a TSMC N7 (7nm) "3D V-Cache" die direct copper to copper hybrid bonded right on top of the 8-core Zen 3 CCD's usual 32MB, increasing the CPU's total L3 cache capacity to 96MB and bringing significant performance improvements for gaming in particular; now rivalling contemporary high-end consumer processors while being much more power efficient and running on older, cheaper motherboards using affordable DDR4 memory. And despite now spanning multiple dies and being three times larger (96MB vs 32MB), the L3 cache's performance remains nearly identical; with X3D only adding around ≈+2ns via an additional three to four cycles of latency. It would later be followed by the Ryzen 5 5600X3D and Ryzen 7 5700X3D for lower-end market segments, and succeeded by the Ryzen 7000X3D family of 3D V Cache equipped Zen 4 processors on the newer socket AM5 platform.

=== Improvements ===
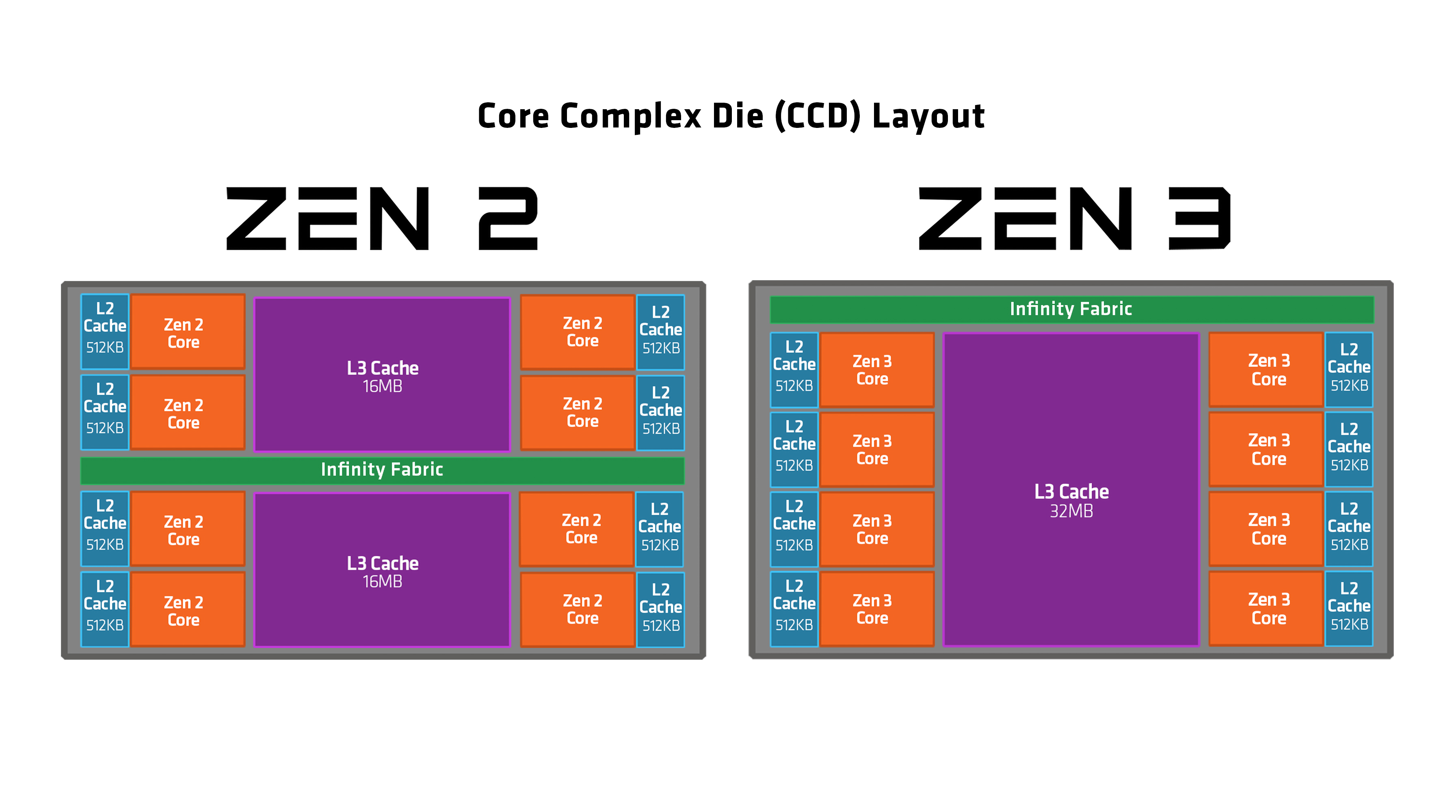
CCD layouts comparison for Zen 2 and Zen 3

Zen 3 has made the following improvements over Zen 2:

- An increase of 19% in instructions per clock
- The base core chiplet has a single eight-core complex (versus two four-core complexes in Zen 2)
- A unified 32MB L3 cache pool equally available to all 8 cores in a chiplet, vs Zen 2's two 16MB pools each shared among 4 cores in a core complex.
  - On mobile: A unified 16MB L3
- A unified 8-core CCX (from 2x 4-core CCX per CCD)
- Increased branch prediction bandwidth. L1 branch target buffer size increased to 1024 entries (vs 512 in Zen 2)
- New instructions
  - VAES – 256-bit Vector AES instructions
  - VPCLMULQDQ – 256-bit Carry-less Multiplication instruction
  - INVLPGB – Broadcast TLB flushing
  - CET_SS – Control-flow Enforcement Technology / Shadow Stack
- Improved integer units
  - 96 entry integer scheduler (up from 92)
  - 192 entry physical register file (up from 180)
  - 10 issue per cycle (up from 7)
  - 256 entry reorder-buffer (up from 224)
  - fewer cycles for DIV/IDIV ops (10...20 from 16...46)
- Improved floating point units
  - 6 μOP dispatch width (up from 4)
  - FMA latency reduced by 1 cycle (down from 5 to 4)
- Additional 64MB 3D vertically stacked dense library L3 cache (in -X3D models)

== Feature tables ==
=== APUs ===
APU features table

== Products ==
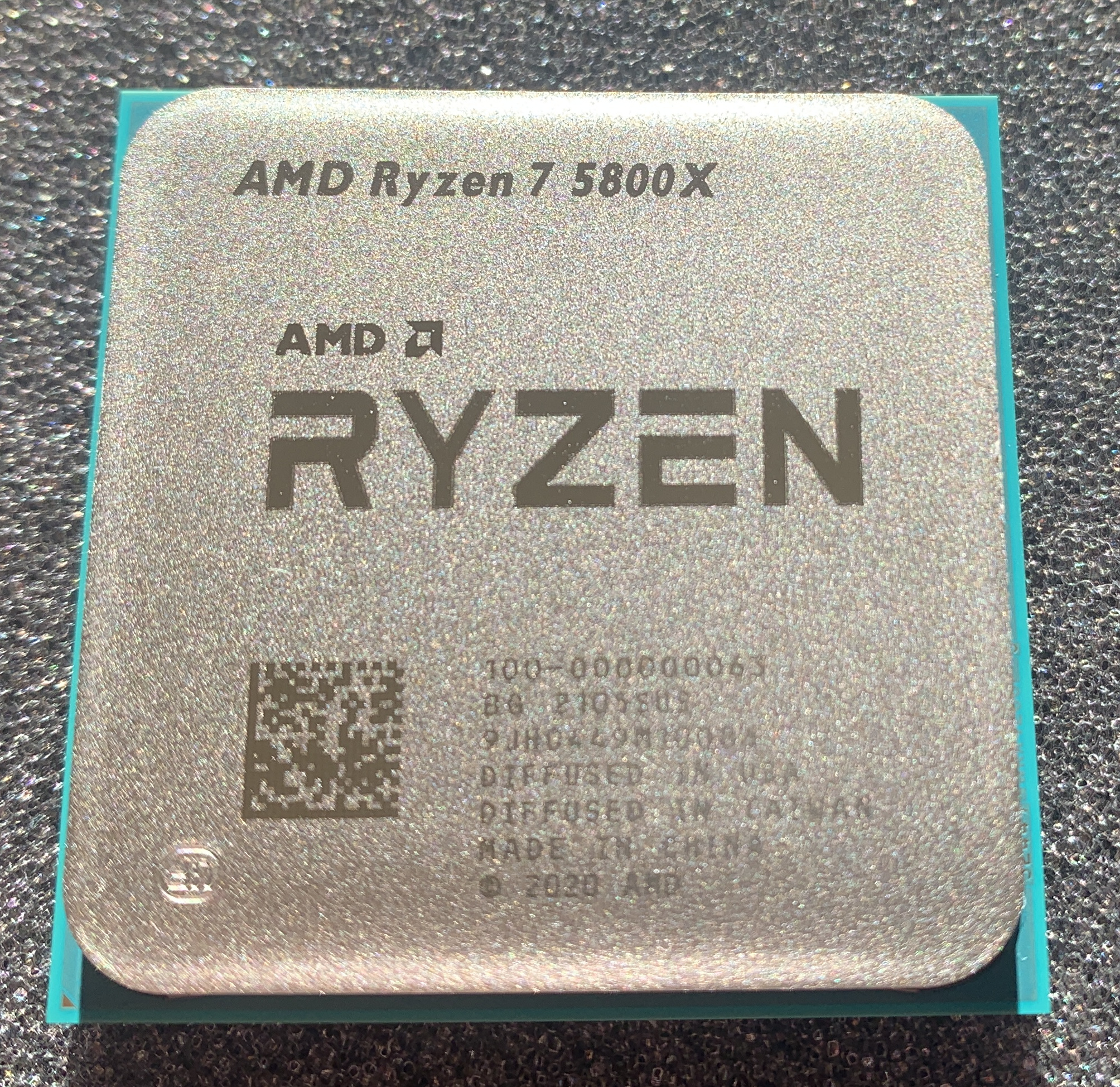
AMD Ryzen 7 5800X

On October 8, 2020, AMD announced four Zen 3-based desktop Ryzen processors, consisting of one Ryzen 5, one Ryzen 7, and two Ryzen 9 CPUs and featuring between 6 and 16 cores.

=== Desktop CPUs ===
==== Vermeer ====
Common features of Ryzen 5000 desktop CPUs:

- Socket: AM4.
- All the CPUs support DDR4-3200 RAM in dual-channel mode in 2x1R and 2x2R configuration, but only DDR4-2933 for 4x1R and only DDR4-2667 for 4x2R.
- All the CPUs support 24 PCIe 4.0 lanes. 4 of the lanes are reserved as link to the chipset.
- No integrated graphics.
- L1 cache: 64 KB per core (32 KB data + 32 KB instruction).
- L2 cache: 512 KB per core.
- Fabrication process: TSMC 7FF.

Branding and model		Cores (threads)	Clock rate (GHz)		L3 cache (total)	TDP	Chiplets	Core config (Note: Core Complexes (CCX) × cores per CCX)	Thermal solution	Release date	MSRP
Branding and model		Cores (threads)	Base	Boost	L3 cache (total)	TDP	Chiplets	Core config	Thermal solution	Release date	MSRP
Ryzen 9	5950X	16 (32)	3.4	4.9	64 MB	105 W	2 × CCD; 1 × I/OD	2 × 8	—N/a	Nov 5, 2020	US $799
Ryzen 9	5900XT	16 (32)	3.3	4.8	64 MB	105 W	2 × CCD; 1 × I/OD	2 × 8	—N/a	Jul 31, 2024	US $349
Ryzen 9	5900X	12 (24)	3.7	4.8	64 MB	105 W	2 × CCD; 1 × I/OD	2 × 6	—N/a	Nov 5, 2020	US $549
Ryzen 9	5900	12 (24)	3.0	4.7	64 MB	65 W	2 × CCD; 1 × I/OD	2 × 6	—N/a	Jan 12, 2021	OEM
Ryzen 9	PRO 5945	12 (24)	3.0	4.7	64 MB	65 W	2 × CCD; 1 × I/OD	2 × 6	—N/a	Sep 2022	OEM
Ryzen 7	5800X3D (Note: A "10th Anniversary Edition" (referencing the launch date of Socket AM4) was launched on June 25, 2026, bundled together with a thermal pad.)	8 (16)	3.4	4.5	96 MB	105 W	1 × CCD; 1 × I/OD	1 × 8	—N/a	Apr 20, 2022; Jun 25, 2026 (10th ann. ed.)	US $449; US $349 (10th ann. ed.)
Ryzen 7	5800XT	8 (16)	3.8	4.8	32 MB	105 W	1 × CCD; 1 × I/OD	1 × 8	Wraith Prism, None (Note: On August 1, 2025, AMD downgraded or ceased including coolers on select models, as a result of its discontinuation of the Wraith Prism and Wraith Spire.)	Jul 31, 2024	US $249
Ryzen 7	5800X	8 (16)	3.8	4.7	32 MB	105 W	1 × CCD; 1 × I/OD	1 × 8	—N/a	Nov 5, 2020	US $449
Ryzen 7	5800	8 (16)	3.4	4.6	32 MB	65 W	1 × CCD; 1 × I/OD	1 × 8	—N/a	Jan 12, 2021	OEM
Ryzen 7	5700X3D	8 (16)	3.0	4.1	96 MB	105 W	1 × CCD; 1 × I/OD	1 × 8	—N/a	Jan 31, 2024	US $249
Ryzen 7	5700X	8 (16)	3.4	4.6	32 MB	65 W	1 × CCD; 1 × I/OD	1 × 8	—N/a	Apr 4, 2022	US $299
Ryzen 7	PRO 5845	8 (16)	3.4	4.6	32 MB	65 W	1 × CCD; 1 × I/OD	1 × 8	—N/a	Sep 2022	OEM
Ryzen 5	5600X3D	6 (12)	3.3	4.4	96 MB	105 W	1 × CCD; 1 × I/OD	1 × 6	—N/a	Jul 7, 2023	US $229; US Only
Ryzen 5	5600XT	6 (12)	3.7	4.7	32 MB	65 W	1 × CCD; 1 × I/OD	1 × 6	Wraith Stealth	Oct 31, 2024	US $194
Ryzen 5	5600X	6 (12)	3.7	4.6	32 MB	65 W	1 × CCD; 1 × I/OD	1 × 6	Wraith Stealth	Nov 5, 2020	US $299
Ryzen 5	5600T	6 (12)	3.5	4.5	32 MB	65 W	1 × CCD; 1 × I/OD	1 × 6	Wraith Stealth	Oct 31, 2024	US $186
Ryzen 5	5600	6 (12)	3.5	4.4	32 MB	65 W	1 × CCD; 1 × I/OD	1 × 6	Wraith Stealth	Apr 4, 2022	US $199
Ryzen 5	5600F	6 (12)	3.0	4.0	32 MB	65 W	1 × CCD; 1 × I/OD	1 × 6	Wraith Stealth	Sep 16, 2025	APJ Only
Ryzen 5	PRO 5645	6 (12)	3.7	4.6	32 MB	65 W	1 × CCD; 1 × I/OD	1 × 6	—N/a	Sep 2022	OEM
Ryzen 5	5500X3D	6 (12)	3.0	4.0	96 MB	105 W	1 × CCD; 1 × I/OD	1 × 6	—N/a	Jun 5, 2025	¥‌1099, LATAM, China and UK Only
Ryzen 5	5500F	6 (12)	3.0	4.4	16 MB	65 W	1 × CCD; 1 × I/OD	1 × 6	Wraith Stealth	Sep 10, 2026	US $99

==== Cezanne ====
Based on the Ryzen 5000 series APUs but with the integrated graphics disabled. Common features of Ryzen 5000 (Cezanne) desktop CPUs:

- Socket: AM4.
- CPUs support DDR4-3200 in dual-channel mode.
- L1 cache: 64 KB (32 KB data + 32 KB instruction) per core.
- L2 cache: 512 KB per core.
- CPUs support 24 PCIe 3.0 lanes. 4 of the lanes are reserved as link to the chipset.
- No integrated graphics.
- Fabrication process: TSMC 7FF.

Branding and model		Cores (threads)	Thermal solution	Clock rate (GHz)		L3 cache (total)	TDP	Core config (Note: Core Complexes (CCX) × cores per CCX)	Release date	MSRP (USD)
Branding and model		Cores (threads)	Thermal solution	Base	Boost	L3 cache (total)	TDP	Core config	Release date	MSRP (USD)
Ryzen 7	5700	8 (16)	Wraith Stealth	3.7	4.6	16 MB	65 W	1 × 8	Apr 4, 2022 (OEM), Jan 31, 2024 (retail)	$175
Ryzen 5	5500	6 (12)	Wraith Stealth	3.6	4.2	16 MB	65 W	1 × 6	Apr 4, 2022	$159
Ryzen 3	5100	4 (8)	–	3.8	4.2	8 MB	65 W	1 × 4	2023	OEM

5100, 5500, and 5700 have no ECC support like non-Pro Ryzen 5000 Desktop APUs.

==== Chagall ====
Common features of Ryzen 5000 workstation CPUs:

- Socket: sWRX8.
- All the CPUs support DDR4-3200 in octa-channel mode.
- L1 cache: 64 KB (32 KB data + 32 KB instruction) per core.
- L2 cache: 512 KB per core.
- All the CPUs support 128 PCIe 4.0 lanes. 8 of the lanes are reserved as link to the chipset.
- No integrated graphics.
- Fabrication process: TSMC 7FF.

Branding and Model		Cores (threads)	Clock rate (GHz)		L3 cache (total)	TDP	Chiplets	Core config (Note: Core Complexes (CCX) × cores per CCX)	Release date	MSRP
Branding and Model		Cores (threads)	Base	Boost	L3 cache (total)	TDP	Chiplets	Core config	Release date	MSRP
Ryzen Threadripper PRO	5995WX	64 (128)	2.7	4.5	256 MB	280 W	8 × CCD; 1 × I/OD	8 × 8	Mar 8, 2022 (OEM) / ? (retail)	OEM / US $6500
Ryzen Threadripper PRO	5975WX	32 (64)	3.6	4.5	128 MB	280 W	4 × CCD; 1 × I/OD	4 × 8	Mar 8, 2022 (OEM) / ? (retail)	OEM / US $3300
Ryzen Threadripper PRO	5965WX	24 (48)	3.8	4.5	128 MB	280 W	4 × CCD; 1 × I/OD	4 × 6	Mar 8, 2022 (OEM) / ? (retail)	OEM / US $2400
Ryzen Threadripper PRO	5955WX	16 (32)	4.0	4.5	64 MB	280 W	2 × CCD; 1 × I/OD	2 × 8	Mar 8, 2022	OEM
Ryzen Threadripper PRO	5945WX	12 (24)	4.1	4.5	64 MB	280 W	2 × CCD; 1 × I/OD	2 × 6	Mar 8, 2022	OEM

=== Desktop APUs ===
==== Cezanne ====
Common features of Ryzen 5000 desktop APUs:

- Socket: AM4.
- All the CPUs support DDR4-3200 in dual-channel mode.
- L1 cache: 64 KB (32 KB data + 32 KB instruction) per core.
- L2 cache: 512 KB per core.
- All the CPUs support 24 PCIe 3.0 lanes. 4 of the lanes are reserved as link to the chipset.
- Includes integrated GCN 5th generation GPU.
- Fabrication process: TSMC 7FF.

Branding and model		CPU					GPU (Note: All of the iGPUs are branded as AMD Radeon Graphics.)			Thermal solution	TDP	Release date	MSRP
Branding and model		Cores (threads)	Clock rate (GHz)		L3 cache (total)	Core config (Note: Core Complexes (CCX) × cores per CCX)	Clock (MHz)	Config (Note: Unified shaders : texture mapping units : render output units and compute units (CU))	Processing power (Note: Single precision performance is calculated from the base (or boost) core clock speed based on a FMA operation.) (GFLOPS)	Thermal solution	TDP	Release date	MSRP
Branding and model		Cores (threads)	Base	Boost	L3 cache (total)	Core config	Clock (MHz)	Config	Processing power (GFLOPS)	Thermal solution	TDP	Release date	MSRP
Ryzen 7	5705G	8 (16)	3.8	4.6	16 MB	1 × 8	2000	512:32:8; 8 CU	2048	—N/a	65 W		
Ryzen 7	5700G (Note: Model also available as PRO version as 5350GE, 5350G, 5650GE, 5650G, 5750GE, 5750G, released June 1, 2021. Refresh models 5355GE, 5355G, 5655GE, 5655G, 5755GE, 5755G released September 5, 2024.)	8 (16)	3.8	4.6	16 MB	1 × 8	2000	512:32:8; 8 CU	2048	Wraith Stealth	65 W	Apr 13, 2021 (OEM), Aug 5, 2021 (retail)	US $359
Ryzen 7	5705GE	8 (16)	3.2	4.6	16 MB	1 × 8	2000	512:32:8; 8 CU	2048	—N/a	35 W		
Ryzen 7	5700GE	8 (16)	3.2	4.6	16 MB	1 × 8	2000	512:32:8; 8 CU	2048	Wraith Stealth	35 W	Apr 13, 2021	OEM
Ryzen 5	5600GT	6 (12)	3.6	4.6	16 MB	1 × 6	1900	448:28:8; 7 CU	1702.4	Wraith Stealth	65 W	Jan 31, 2024	US $140
Ryzen 5	5605G	6 (12)	3.9	4.4	16 MB	1 × 6	1900	448:28:8; 7 CU	1702.4	—N/a	65 W		
Ryzen 5	5600G	6 (12)	3.9	4.4	16 MB	1 × 6	1900	448:28:8; 7 CU	1702.4	Wraith Stealth	65 W	Apr 13, 2021 (OEM), Aug 5, 2021 (retail)	US $259
Ryzen 5	5605GE	6 (12)	3.4	4.4	16 MB	1 × 6	1900	448:28:8; 7 CU	1702.4	—N/a	35 W		
Ryzen 5	5600GE	6 (12)	3.4	4.4	16 MB	1 × 6	1900	448:28:8; 7 CU	1702.4	Wraith Stealth	35 W	Apr 13, 2021	OEM
Ryzen 5	5500GT	6 (12)	3.6	4.4	16 MB	1 × 6	1900	448:28:8; 7 CU	1702.4	Wraith Stealth	65 W	Jan 08, 2024	US $125
Ryzen 3	5305G	4 (8)	4.0	4.2	8 MB	1 × 4	1700	384:24:8; 6 CU	1305.6	—N/a	65 W		
Ryzen 3	5300G	4 (8)	4.0	4.2	8 MB	1 × 4	1700	384:24:8; 6 CU	1305.6	OEM	65 W	Apr 13, 2021	OEM
Ryzen 3	5305GE	4 (8)	3.6	4.2	8 MB	1 × 4	1700	384:24:8; 6 CU	1305.6	—N/a	35 W		
Ryzen 3	5300GE	4 (8)	3.6	4.2	8 MB	1 × 4	1700	384:24:8; 6 CU	1305.6	OEM	35 W	Apr 13, 2021	OEM

=== Mobile APUs ===
==== Cezanne ====
Branding and Model		CPU					GPU				TDP	Release date
Branding and Model		Cores (Threads)	Clock rate (GHz)		L3 cache (total)	Core config (Note: Core Complexes (CCX) × cores per CCX)	Model	Clock (GHz)	Config (Note: Unified shaders : texture mapping units : render output units and compute units (CU))	Processing power (GFLOPS) (Note: Single precision performance is calculated from the base (or boost) core clock speed based on a FMA operation.)	TDP	Release date
Branding and Model		Cores (Threads)	Base	Boost	L3 cache (total)	Core config	Model	Clock (GHz)	Config	Processing power (GFLOPS)	TDP	Release date
Ryzen 9	5980HX	8 (16)	3.3	4.8	16 MB	1 × 8	Radeon; Graphics (Note: All of the iGPUs are branded as AMD Radeon Graphics.)	2.1	512:32:8; 8 CUs	2150.4	35–54 W	Jan 12, 2021
Ryzen 9	5980HS	8 (16)	3.0	4.8	16 MB	1 × 8	Radeon; Graphics	2.1	512:32:8; 8 CUs	2150.4	35 W	Jan 12, 2021
Ryzen 9	5900HX	8 (16)	3.3	4.6	16 MB	1 × 8	Radeon; Graphics	2.1	512:32:8; 8 CUs	2150.4	35–54 W	Jan 12, 2021
Ryzen 9	5900HS	8 (16)	3.0	4.6	16 MB	1 × 8	Radeon; Graphics	2.1	512:32:8; 8 CUs	2150.4	35 W	Jan 12, 2021
Ryzen 7	5800H	8 (16)	3.2	4.4	16 MB	1 × 8	Radeon; Graphics	2.0	512:32:8; 8 CUs	2048	35–54 W	Jan 12, 2021
Ryzen 7	5800HS	8 (16)	2.8	4.4	16 MB	1 × 8	Radeon; Graphics	2.0	512:32:8; 8 CUs	2048	35 W	Jan 12, 2021
Ryzen 7	5800U (Note: Model also available as PRO version as 5450U, 5650U, 5850U, released on March 16, 2021.)	8 (16)	1.9	4.4	16 MB	1 × 8	Radeon; Graphics	2.0	512:32:8; 8 CUs	2048	10–25 W	Jan 12, 2021
Ryzen 5	5600H	6 (12)	3.3	4.2	16 MB	1 × 6	Radeon; Graphics	1.8	448:28:8; 7 CUs	1612.8	35–54 W	Jan 12, 2021
Ryzen 5	5600HS	6 (12)	3.0	4.2	16 MB	1 × 6	Radeon; Graphics	1.8	448:28:8; 7 CUs	1612.8	35 W	Jan 12, 2021
Ryzen 5	5600U	6 (12)	2.3	4.2	16 MB	1 × 6	Radeon; Graphics	1.8	448:28:8; 7 CUs	1612.8	10–25 W	Jan 12, 2021
Ryzen 5	5560U	6 (12)	2.3	4.0	8 MB	1 × 6	Radeon; Graphics	1.6	384:24:8; 6 CUs	1228.8	10–25 W	Jan 12, 2021
Ryzen 3	5400U	4 (8)	2.7	4.1	8 MB	1 × 4	Radeon; Graphics	1.6	384:24:8; 6 CUs	1228.8	10–25 W	Jan 12, 2021

==== Barceló ====
Branding and model		CPU					GPU				TDP	Release date
Branding and model		Cores (Threads)	Clock rate (GHz)		L3 cache (total)	Core config (Note: Core Complexes (CCX) × cores per CCX)	Model	Clock (GHz)	Config (Note: Unified shaders : texture mapping units : render output units and compute units (CU))	Processing power (GFLOPS) (Note: Single precision performance is calculated from the base (or boost) core clock speed based on a FMA operation.)	TDP	Release date
Branding and model		Cores (Threads)	Base	Boost	L3 cache (total)	Core config	Model	Clock (GHz)	Config	Processing power (GFLOPS)	TDP	Release date
Ryzen 7	5825U (Note: Model also available as Pro version as 5475U, 5675U, 5875U, released on April 19, 2022.) (Note: Model also available as Chromebook optimized version as 5425C, 5625C, 5825C, released on May 5, 2022.)	8 (16)	2.0	4.5	16 MB	1 × 8	Radeon; Graphics (Note: All of the iGPUs are branded as AMD Radeon Graphics.)	2.0	512:32:8; 8 CUs	2048	15 W	Jan 4, 2022
Ryzen 5	5625U	6 (12)	2.3	4.3	16 MB	1 × 6	Radeon; Graphics	1.8	448:28:8; 7 CUs	1612.8	15 W	Jan 4, 2022
Ryzen 3	5425U	4 (8)	2.7	4.1	8 MB	1 × 4	Radeon; Graphics	1.6	384:24:6; 6 CUs	?	15 W	Jan 30, 2022
Ryzen 3	5125C	2 (4)	3.0	—N/a	8 MB	1 × 2	Radeon; Graphics	?	192:12:8; 3 CU	?	15 W	May 5, 2022

==== Barceló-R ====
Common features of Ryzen 7030 notebook APUs:

- Socket: FP6.
- All the CPUs support DDR4-3200 or LPDDR4-4266 in dual-channel mode.
- L1 cache: 64 KB (32 KB data + 32 KB instruction) per core.
- L2 cache: 512 KB per core.
- All the CPUs support 16 PCIe 3.0 lanes.
- Native USB 40Gbps (USB4) Ports: 0
- Native USB 10Gbps (USB 3.2 Gen 2 operation mode) Ports: 2
- Includes integrated GCN 5th generation GPU.
- Fabrication process: TSMC N7 FinFET.

Branding and Model		CPU					GPU			TDP	Release date
Branding and Model		Cores (threads)	Clock rate (GHz)		L3 cache (total)	Core config (Note: Core Complexes (CCX) × cores per CCX)	Model	Clock (GHz)	Processing power (Note: Single precision performance is calculated from the base (or boost) core clock speed based on a FMA operation.) (GFLOPS)	TDP	Release date
Branding and Model		Cores (threads)	Base	Boost	L3 cache (total)	Core config	Model	Clock (GHz)	Processing power (GFLOPS)	TDP	Release date
Ryzen 7	(PRO) 7730U	8 (16)	2.0	4.5	16 MB	1 × 8	Vega; 8 CU	2.0	2048	15 W	January 4, 2023
Ryzen 5	(PRO) 7530U	6 (12)	2.0	4.5	16 MB	1 × 6	Vega; 7 CU	2.0	1792	15 W	January 4, 2023
Ryzen 5	7430U	6 (12)	2.3	4.3	16 MB	1 × 6	Vega; 7 CU	1.8	1613	15 W	Q4 2023
Ryzen 3	(PRO) 7330U	4 (8)	2.3	4.3	8 MB	1 × 4	Vega; 6 CU	1.8	1382	15 W	January 4, 2023

=== Embedded CPUs ===
Model	Release date	Fab	CPU						Socket	PCIe support	Memory support	TDP
Model	Release date	Fab	Cores (threads)	Clock rate (GHz)		Cache			Socket	PCIe support	Memory support	TDP
Model	Release date	Fab	Cores (threads)	Base	Boost	L1	L2	L3	Socket	PCIe support	Memory support	TDP
V3C14	September 27, 2022	TSMC; 7FF	4 (8)	2.3	3.8	32 KB inst. 32 KB data per core	512 KB per core	8 MB	FP7r2	20 (8+4+4+4); PCIe 4.0	DDR5-4800 dual-channel	15 W
V3C44	September 27, 2022	TSMC; 7FF	4 (8)	3.5	3.8	32 KB inst. 32 KB data per core	512 KB per core	8 MB	FP7r2	20 (8+4+4+4); PCIe 4.0	DDR5-4800 dual-channel	45 W
V3C16	September 27, 2022	TSMC; 7FF	6 (12)	2.0	3.8	32 KB inst. 32 KB data per core	512 KB per core	16 MB	FP7r2	20 (8+4+4+4); PCIe 4.0	DDR5-4800 dual-channel	15 W
V3C18I	September 27, 2022	TSMC; 7FF	8 (16)	1.9	3.8	32 KB inst. 32 KB data per core	512 KB per core	16 MB	FP7r2	20 (8+4+4+4); PCIe 4.0	DDR5-4800 dual-channel	15 W
V3C48	September 27, 2022	TSMC; 7FF	8 (16)	3.3	3.8	32 KB inst. 32 KB data per core	512 KB per core	16 MB	FP7r2	20 (8+4+4+4); PCIe 4.0	DDR5-4800 dual-channel	45 W

=== Server CPUs ===
The Epyc server line of chips based on Zen 3 is named Milan and is the final generation of chips using the SP3 socket. Epyc Milan was released on March 15, 2021.

Common features:

- SP3 socket
- Zen 3 microarchitecture
- TSMC 7 nm process for the compute and cache dies, GloFo 14 nm process for the I/O die
- MCM with one I/O Die (IOD) and multiple Core Complex Dies (CCD) for compute, one core complex (CCX) per CCD chiplet
- Eight-channel DDR4-3200
- 128 PCIe 4.0 lanes per socket, 64 of which are used for Infinity Fabric inter-processor links in 2P platforms
- 7003X series models include 64 MiB L3 cache dies stacked on top of the compute dies (3D V-Cache)
- 7003P series models are limited to uniprocessor operation (1P, single-socket)

Model	Cores (threads)	Chiplets	Core config (Note: Core Complexes (CCX) × cores per CCX)	Clock rate		Cache size			Socket	Scaling	TDP default (range)	Release price
Model	Cores (threads)	Chiplets	Core config	Base (GHz)	Boost (GHz)	L2 per core	L3 per CCX	Total	Socket	Scaling	TDP default (range)	Release price
7203(P)	8 (16)	2 + IOD	2 × 4	2.8	3.4	512 KB	32 MB	68 MB	SP3	2P (1P)	120 W (120-150)	$348 ($338)
72F3	8 (16)	8 + IOD	8 × 1	3.7	4.1	512 KB	32 MB	260 MB	SP3	2P	180 W (165-200)	$2468
7303(P)	16 (32)	2 + IOD	2 × 8	2.4	3.4	512 KB	32 MB	72 MB	SP3	2P (1P)	130 W (120-150)	$604 ($594)
7313(P)	16 (32)	4 + IOD	4 × 4	3.0	3.7	512 KB	32 MB	136 MB	SP3	2P (1P)	155 W (155-180)	$1083 ($913)
7343	16 (32)	4 + IOD	4 × 4	3.2	3.9	512 KB	32 MB	136 MB	SP3	2P	190 W (165-200)	$1565
73F3	16 (32)	8 + IOD	8 × 2	3.5	4.0	512 KB	32 MB	264 MB	SP3	2P	240 W (225-240)	$3521
7373X	16 (32)	8* + IOD	8 × 2	3.05	3.8	512 KB	96 MB	776 MB	SP3	2P	240 W (225-280)	$4185
7413	24 (48)	4 + IOD	4 × 6	2.65	3.6	512 KB	32 MB	140 MB	SP3	2P	180 W (165-200)	$1825
7443(P)	24 (48)	4 + IOD	4 × 6	2.85	4.0	512 KB	32 MB	140 MB	SP3	2P (1P)	200 W (165-200)	$2010 ($1337)
74F3	24 (48)	8 + IOD	8 × 3	3.2	4.0	512 KB	32 MB	268 MB	SP3	2P	240 W (225-240)	$2900
7473X	24 (48)	8* + IOD	8 × 3	2.8	3.7	512 KB	96 MB	780 MB	SP3	2P	240 W (225-280)	$3900
7453	28 (56)	4 + IOD	4 × 7	2.75	3.45	512 KB	16 MB	78 MB	SP3	2P	225 W (225-240)	$1570
7513	32 (64)	4 + IOD	4 × 8	2.6	3.65	512 KB	32 MB	144 MB	SP3	2P	200 W (165-200)	$2840
7543(P)	32 (64)	8 + IOD	8 × 4	2.8	3.7	512 KB	32 MB	272 MB	SP3	2P (1P)	225 W (225-240)	$3761 ($2730)
75F3	32 (64)	8 + IOD	8 × 4	2.95	4.0	512 KB	32 MB	272 MB	SP3	2P	280 W (225-280)	$4860
7573X	32 (64)	8* + IOD	8 × 4	2.8	3.6	512 KB	96 MB	784 MB	SP3	2P	280 W (225-280)	$5590
7R13	48 (96)	6 + IOD	6 × 8	2.65	3.7	512 KB	32 MB	216 MB	SP3	TBD	TBD	OEM/AWS
7643(P)	48 (96)	8 + IOD	8 × 6	2.3	3.6	512 KB	32 MB	280 MB	SP3	2P (1P)	225 W (225-240)	$4995 ($2722)
7663	56 (112)	8 + IOD	8 × 7	2.0	3.5	512 KB	32 MB	284 MB	SP3	2P	240 W (225-240)	$6366
7663P	56 (112)	8 + IOD	8 × 7	2.0	3.5	512 KB	32 MB	284 MB	SP3	1P	240 W (225-280)	$3139
7713(P)	64 (128)	8 + IOD	8 × 8	2.0	3.675	512 KB	32 MB	288 MB	SP3	2P (1P)	225 W (225-240)	$7060 ($5010)
7763	64 (128)	8 + IOD	8 × 8	2.45	3.4	512 KB	32 MB	288 MB	SP3	2P	280 W (225-280)	$7890
7773X	64 (128)	8* + IOD	8 × 8	2.2	3.5	512 KB	96 MB	800 MB	SP3	2P	280 W (225-280)	$8800

== Zen 3+ ==
AMD Zen 3+
General information
- Launched: April 1, 2022; 4 years ago
- Designed by: AMD
- Common manufacturer: TSMC
- CPUID code: Family 19h

Physical specifications
- Cores: 4 to 8
- Package: Package FP7; Package FP7r2

Cache
- L1 cache: 64 KB (per core)
- L2 cache: 512 KB (per core)
- L3 cache: Up to 16 MB

Architecture and classification
- Technology node: TSMC N6
- Instruction set: AMD64 (x86-64)

Products, models, variants
- Product code names: Thin & Light Mobile; Rembrandt; Rembrandt-R; High-End Mobile; Rembrandt; Rembrandt-R

History
- Predecessor: Zen 3
- Successor: Zen 4

Support status
- Supported

Zen 3+ is the codename for a refresh of the Zen 3 microarchitecture, which focuses on power efficiency improvements. It was released in April 2022 with the Ryzen 6000 series of mobile processors.

=== Features and improvements ===
Zen 3+ has 50 new or enhanced power management features over Zen 3, and also provides an adaptive power management framework, as well as new deep sleep states. Altogether, this brings improvements to efficiency both during idle, and when under load, with up to 30% performance-per-watt increase over Zen 3, as well as longer battery life.

IPC is identical to that of Zen 3; the performance improvements of Ryzen 6000 over Ryzen 5000 mobile processors stem from it having a higher efficiency (hence more performance in power-constrained form factors like laptops), as well as the increased clock speeds from being built on the smaller TSMC N6 node.

The Rembrandt implementation of Zen 3+ also has support for DDR5 and LPDDR5 memory.

iGPU of Zen 3+ can support AV1 hardware decoding.

=== Products ===
==== Warhol (Cancelled) ====
In mid-2020, reports indicated that AMD was preparing a refreshed lineup of Zen 3-based desktop AM4 processors, codenamed “Warhol.” This family was widely expected to be launched as the Ryzen 6000 series for desktops and to serve as the direct successor to “Vermeer,” the original Zen 3 Ryzen CPUs. According to a leaked internal roadmap, Zen 3+ (Warhol) appeared to position as an intermediate step between Zen 3 (Vermeer) and the next major architecture, Zen 4 (Raphael).

Warhol was described as a modest architectural refresh rather than a full redesign with main enhancements centered on transitioning from TSMC’s 7 nm process, to the more efficient TSMC 6 nm (N6) node. While N6 does not introduce major architectural changes, it offers better transistor density and improved power characteristics. As a result, Warhol series was expected to deliver incremental gains in performance—similar in scale to AMD’s earlier Zen+ refresh (Pinnacle Ridge, released as the Ryzen 2000 series), which provided refined performance without altering the core microarchitecture.

However it was reported that AMD ultimately cancelled the Warhol lineup. Multiple factors likely contributed to this decision. The 2020–2023 global chip shortage placed immense strain on foundry capacity worldwide, including TSMC’s ability to satisfy the demand for its 7 nm and 6 nm nodes. AMD decided to focus its resources toward the next major architectural leap: Zen 4 (Raphael), built on TSMC’s 5 nm process. This effectively ended the development of Warhol in favor of the arrival of AMD’s next major CPU lineup.

==== Rembrandt ====
On April 1, 2022, AMD released the Ryzen 6000 series of mobile APUs, codenamed Rembrandt. It introduces PCIe 4.0 and DDR5/LPDDR5 for the first time in an APU for the laptop and also introduced RDNA2 integrated graphics to the PC. It is built on TSMC's 6 nm node.

Common features of Ryzen 6000 notebook APUs:

- Socket: FP7, FP7r2.
- All the CPUs support DDR5-4800 or LPDDR5-6400 in dual-channel mode.
- L1 cache: 64 KB (32 KB data + 32 KB instruction) per core.
- L2 cache: 512 KB per core.
- All the CPUs support 16 PCIe 4.0 lanes.
- Native USB 40Gbps (USB4) Ports: 2
- Native USB 10Gbps (USB 3.2 Gen 2 operation mode) Ports: 2
- Includes integrated RDNA 2 GPU.
- Fabrication process: TSMC N6 FinFET.

Branding and model		CPU					GPU				TDP	Release date
Branding and model		Cores (threads)	Clock (GHz)		L3 cache (total)	Core config (Note: Core Complexes (CCX) × cores per CCX)	Model	Clock (GHz)	Config (Note: Unified shaders : texture mapping units : render output units and compute units (CU))	Processing power (GFLOPS) (Note: Single precision performance is calculated from the base (or boost) core clock speed based on a FMA operation.)	TDP	Release date
Branding and model		Cores (threads)	Base	Boost	L3 cache (total)	Core config	Model	Clock (GHz)	Config	Processing power (GFLOPS)	TDP	Release date
Ryzen 9	6980HX	8 (16)	3.3	5.0	16 MB	1 × 8	680M	2.4	768:48:8; 12 CUs	3686	45 W	Jan 4, 2022
Ryzen 9	6980HS	8 (16)	3.3	5.0	16 MB	1 × 8	680M	2.4	768:48:8; 12 CUs	3686	35 W	Jan 4, 2022
Ryzen 9	6900HX (Note: Model also available as PRO version (6650U, 6650H, 6650HS, 6850U, 6850H, 6850HS, 6950H, 6950HS), released on April 19, 2022.)	8 (16)	3.3	4.9	16 MB	1 × 8	680M	2.4	768:48:8; 12 CUs	3686	45 W	Jan 4, 2022
Ryzen 9	6900HS	8 (16)	3.3	4.9	16 MB	1 × 8	680M	2.4	768:48:8; 12 CUs	3686	35 W	Jan 4, 2022
Ryzen 7	6800H	8 (16)	3.2	4.7	16 MB	1 × 8	680M	2.2	768:48:8; 12 CUs	3379	45 W	Jan 4, 2022
Ryzen 7	6800HS	8 (16)	3.2	4.7	16 MB	1 × 8	680M	2.2	768:48:8; 12 CUs	3379	35 W	Jan 4, 2022
Ryzen 7	6800U	8 (16)	2.7	4.7	16 MB	1 × 8	680M	2.2	768:48:8; 12 CUs	3379	15–28 W	Jan 4, 2022
Ryzen 5	6600H	6 (12)	3.3	4.5	16 MB	1 × 6	660M	1.9	384:24:8; 6 CUs	1459	45 W	Jan 4, 2022
Ryzen 5	6600HS	6 (12)	3.3	4.5	16 MB	1 × 6	660M	1.9	384:24:8; 6 CUs	1459	35 W	Jan 4, 2022
Ryzen 5	6600U	6 (12)	2.9	4.5	16 MB	1 × 6	660M	1.9	384:24:8; 6 CUs	1459	15–28 W	Jan 4, 2022

==== Rembrandt-R ====
Rembrandt-R is the codename for a refresh of Rembrandt codenamed processors, released as the Ryzen 7035 series of mobile APUs in January 2023. These processors was relaunched again as Ryzen 100 series in October 2025.

Common features of Ryzen 7035 notebook APUs:

- Socket: FP7, FP7r2.
- All the CPUs support DDR5-4800 or LPDDR5-6400 in dual-channel mode.
- L1 cache: 64 KB (32 KB data + 32 KB instruction) per core.
- L2 cache: 512 KB per core.
- All the CPUs support 16 PCIe 4.0 lanes.
- Native USB 40Gbps (USB4) Ports: 2
- Native USB 10Gbps (USB 3.2 Gen 2 operation mode) Ports: 2
- Includes integrated RDNA 2 GPU.
- Fabrication process: TSMC N6 FinFET.

Branding and model		CPU					GPU			TDP	Release date
Branding and model		Cores (threads)	Clock (GHz)		L3 cache (total)	Core config (Note: Core Complexes (CCX) × cores per CCX)	Model	Clock (GHz)	Processing power (Note: Single precision performance is calculated from the base (or boost) core clock speed based on a FMA operation.) (GFLOPS)	TDP	Release date
Branding and model		Cores (threads)	Base	Boost	L3 cache (total)	Core config	Model	Clock (GHz)	Processing power (GFLOPS)	TDP	Release date
Ryzen 7	7735HS	8 (16)	3.2	4.75	16 MB	1 × 8	680M; 12 CU	2.2	3379	35–54 W	April 30, 2023
Ryzen 7	7735H	8 (16)	3.2	4.75	16 MB	1 × 8	680M; 12 CU	2.2	3379	35–54 W	April 30, 2023
Ryzen 7	7736U	8 (16)	2.7	4.7	16 MB	1 × 8	680M; 12 CU	2.2	3379	15–28 W	January 4, 2023
Ryzen 7	7735U	8 (16)	2.7	4.75	16 MB	1 × 8	680M; 12 CU	2.2	3379	15–30 W	January 4, 2023
Ryzen 7	7435HS	8 (16)	3.1	4.5	16 MB	1 × 8	—N/a			35–54 W	2024
Ryzen 7	7435H	8 (16)	3.1	4.5	16 MB	1 × 8	—N/a			35–54 W	2024
Ryzen 5	7535HS	6 (12)	3.3	4.55	16 MB	1 × 6	660M; 6 CU	1.9	1459	35–54 W	April 30, 2023
Ryzen 5	7535H	6 (12)	3.3	4.55	16 MB	1 × 6	660M; 6 CU	1.9	1459	35–54 W	April 30, 2023
Ryzen 5	7535U	6 (12)	2.9	4.55	16 MB	1 × 6	660M; 6 CU	1.9	1459	15–30 W	January 4, 2023
Ryzen 5	7235HS	4 (8)	3.2	4.2	8 MB	1 × 4	—N/a			35–53 W	2024
Ryzen 5	7235H	4 (8)	3.2	4.2	8 MB	1 × 4	—N/a			35–53 W	2024
Ryzen 3	7335U	4 (8)	3.0	4.3	8 MB	1 × 4	660M; 4 CU	1.8	922	15–30 W	January 4, 2023

Common features of Ryzen 100 notebook APUs:

- Socket: FP7, FP7r2.
- All the CPUs support DDR5-4800 or LPDDR5-6400 in dual-channel mode.
- L1 cache: 64 KB (32 KB data + 32 KB instruction) per core.
- L2 cache: 512 KB per core.
- All the CPUs support 16 PCIe 4.0 lanes.
- Native USB 40Gbps (USB4) Ports: 0
- Native USB 10Gbps (USB 3.2 Gen 2 operation mode) Ports: 2
- Includes integrated RDNA 2 GPU.
- Fabrication process: TSMC N6 FinFET.

Branding and model		CPU					GPU			TDP (cTDP)	Release date
Branding and model		Cores (threads)	Clock (GHz)		L3 cache (total)	Core config (Note: Core Complexes (CCX) × cores per CCX)	Model	Clock (GHz)	Processing power (Note: Single precision performance is calculated from the base (or boost) core clock speed based on a FMA operation.) (GFLOPS)	TDP (cTDP)	Release date
Branding and model		Cores (threads)	Base	Boost	L3 cache (total)	Core config	Model	Clock (GHz)	Processing power (GFLOPS)	TDP (cTDP)	Release date
Ryzen 7	170	8 (16)	3.2	4.75	16 MB	1 × 8	680M; 12 CU	2.2	3379	45 W (35–54 W)	October 1, 2025
Ryzen 7	160	8 (16)	2.7	4.75	16 MB	1 × 8	680M; 12 CU	2.2	3379	28 W (15–30 W)	October 1, 2025
Ryzen 5	150	6 (12)	3.3	4.55	16 MB	1 × 6	660M; 6 CU	1.9	1459	45 W (35–54 W)	October 1, 2025
Ryzen 5	130	6 (12)	2.9	4.55	16 MB	1 × 6	660M; 6 CU	1.9	1459	28 W (15–30 W)	October 1, 2025
Ryzen 3	110	4 (8)	3.0	4.3	8 MB	1 × 4	660M; 4 CU	1.8	922	28 W (15–30 W)	October 1, 2025

Turion / ULV		Node range label	x86			
Microarchi.	Step	Node range label	Microarchi.	Step		
		180 nm	K7	Athlon Classic		
		180 nm	K7	Thunderbird		
		180 nm	K7	Palomino		
		130 nm	K7	Thoroughbred		
		130 nm	K7	Barton/Thorton		
		130 nm	K8	ClawHammer		
		130 nm	K8	Newcastle		
		130 nm	K8	SledgeHammer		
K8L	Lancaster	90 nm	K8	Winchester	K8(×2)	K9
K8L	Richmond	90 nm	K8	San Diego	Toledo	~~Greyhound~~
K8L	Taylor / Trinidad	90 nm	K8	San Diego	Windsor	
K8L	Tyler	65 nm	K8	Orleans	Brisbane	
K8L	Lion	65 nm	K10	Phenom	4 cores on mainstream desktop, DDR3 introduced	
K8L	Caspian	45 nm	K10	Phenom II / Athlon II	6 cores on mainstream desktop	
14h	Bobcat	40 nm				
		32 nm	K10	Lynx		
		32 nm	K10	Llano	APU introduced; CPU and GPU on single die	
		32 nm	Bulldozer 15h	Bulldozer	8 cores on mainstream desktop	
		32 nm	Bulldozer 15h	Piledriver		
16h	Jaguar	28 nm	Bulldozer 15h	Steamroller	APU/mobile-only	
16h	Puma	28 nm	Bulldozer 15h	Excavator	APU/mobile-only, DDR4 introduced	
K12	~~K12 (ARM64)~~	14 nm	Zen	Zen	SMT introduced	
		12 nm	Zen	Zen+		
		7 nm	Zen	Zen 2	12 and 16 cores on mainstream desktop, chiplet design	
		7 nm	Zen	Zen 3	3D V-Cache variants introduced	
		6 nm	Zen	Zen 3+	Mobile-only, DDR5 introduced	
		5 nm / 4 nm	Zen	Zen 4	High core density "Cloud" (Zen xc) variants introduced	
		4 nm / 3 nm	Zen	Zen 5	Ryzen AI NPU cores introduced	
		3 nm / 2 nm	Zen	Zen 6		
		16A / 14A	Zen	Zen 7		
