= Socket SP5 =

CPU socket for AMD CPUs

- Release date: November 10, 2022
- Designed by: AMD
- Manufactured by: Lotes; Foxconn
- Type: LGA-ZIF
- Chip form factors: Flip-chip
- Contacts: 6096
- FSB protocol: PCI Express; Infinity Fabric
- Voltage range: 0.8 V (cores); 1.2 V (I/O)
- Processor dimensions: 72 × 75.4 mm 5,428.8 mm^{2}
- Processors: Epyc: Genoa; Bergamo; Turin
- Predecessor: Socket SP3
- Successor: Socket SP7
- Memory support: ECC DDR5
- This article is part of the CPU socket series

Socket SP5 (LGA 6096) is a zero insertion force land grid array CPU socket designed by AMD supporting its Zen 4-based Epyc server processors codenamed Genoa that launched on November 10, 2022.

== History ==
In June 2017, with the launch of the first generation Epyc server processors, AMD introduced the SP3 socket. The SP3 socket covered three generations of Epyc processors, including Naples, Rome and Milan. AMD's Genoa processors contain up to 96 Zen 4 cores compared to Milan's maximum of 64 cores. In support of Genoa's 96 cores, AMD introduced the SP5 socket with 2022 more contact pins than the SP3 socket to provide greater power delivery and signal integrity. SP5 can provide a peak power of up to 700 W.

The SP5 socket supports Epyc processors codenamed Bergamo, which have up to 128 small Zen 4c cores and were launched on June 13, 2023.

== Features ==
- Supports 12 channels of DDR5 ECC RAM with 6 TB maximum capacity per socket. Using a dual socket system can allow up to 24 channels of DDR5 ECC RAM with maximum 12 TB RAM capacity.
- Supports 128 lanes of PCI Express 5.0

Pin map of the SP5 socket from AMD

== Chipsets ==
- Supports a chipset for building a motherboard around the socket. AMD has produced a chipset that provides Epyc processors with certain integrated devices and essential functionality like BIOS.

== See also ==
- Socket AM5, contemporary desktop socket from AMD in use since 2022
- Socket SP6, server socket for low power and edge systems supporting the Siena family of processors
