= Socket sTR5 =

CPU socket for AMD HEDT/workstation CPUs

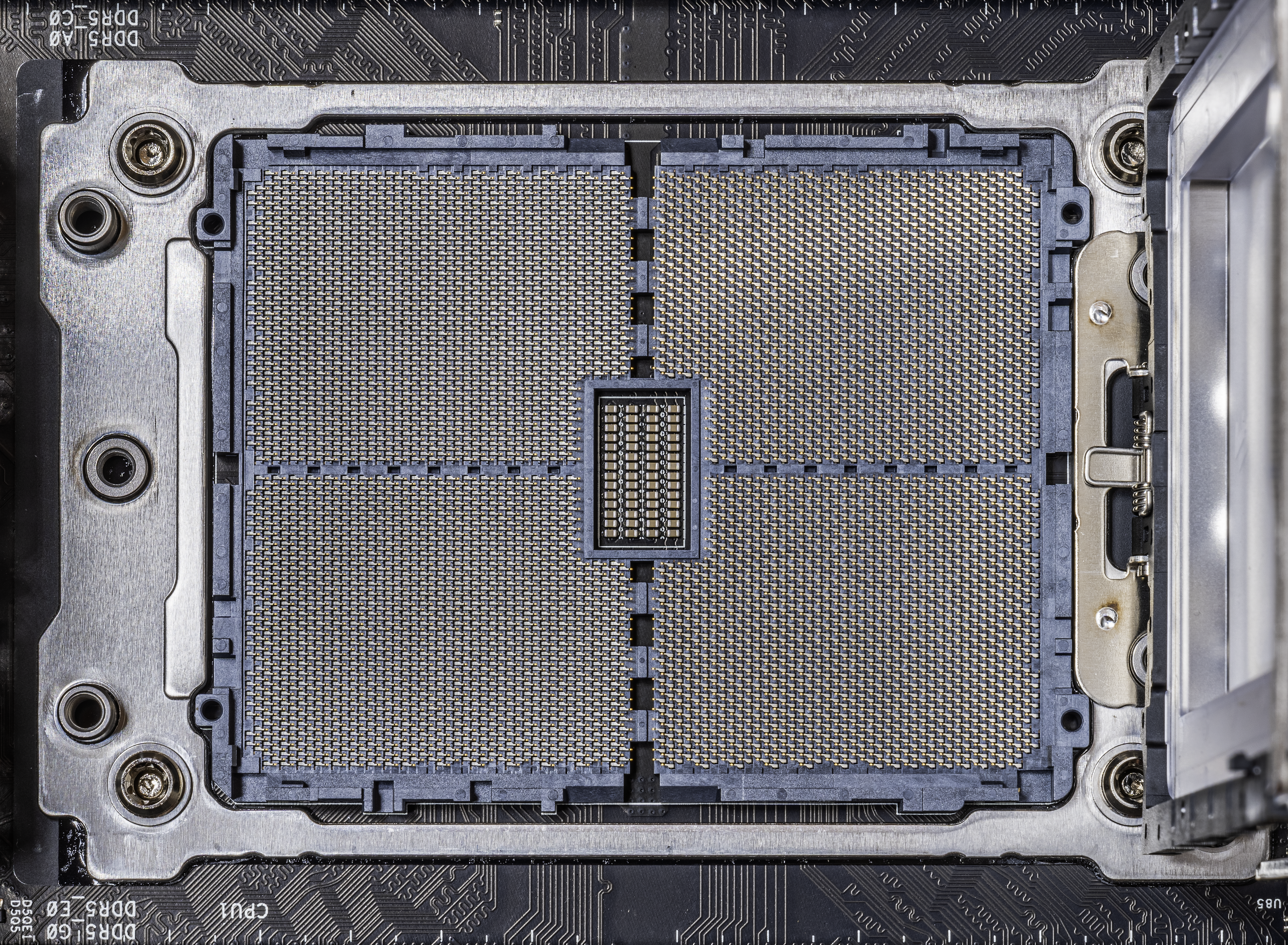
- Type: LGA-ZIF
- Chip form factors: Flip-chip
- Contacts: 4,844
- FSB protocol: PCI Express, Infinity Fabric
- Processor dimensions: 58.5mm × 75.4mm 4410.9 mm^{2}
- Processors: Ryzen Threadripper: Storm Peak; Shimada Peak; Ryzen Threadripper PRO: Storm Peak; Shimada Peak
- Predecessor: sTRX4; sWRX8
- Variant: Socket SP6
- Memory support: DDR5
- This article is part of the CPU socket series

Socket sTR5 is a land grid array (LGA) CPU socket designed by AMD. It supports the Zen 4-based Ryzen Threadripper 7000 series, which launched in November 2023. It is also used for the Zen 5 Ryzen Threadripper 9000 series.

== Details ==
sTR5 is a socket for both Ryzen Threadripper HEDT and Ryzen Threadripper Pro workstation processor lineups. This is unlike the preceding (3000 and 5000 series) generations of Ryzen Threadripper / Threadripper Pro processors, which were on separate sockets, sTRX4 and sWRX8 respectively.

The sTR5 socket has two chipsets available: TRX50 for HEDT consumer systems, and WRX90 for professional workstation systems. TRX50 supports both Threadripper and Threadripper PRO CPU models, while WRX90 supports only Threadripper Pro models.

Socket sTR5 supports DDR5 memory of the RDIMM type with ECC, as well as PCIe 5.0. It does not support non-registered DIMMs, non-ECC RAM, or DDR4. The maximum number of memory channels is 8 and the maximum number of PCIe 5.0 lanes is 128 with a Threadripper PRO CPU and a WRX90 motherboard.

== See also ==
- Ryzen
- Socket sWRX8
- Socket sTRX4
- Socket SP6
