= Threadripper =

Brand of microprocessors

AMD Threadripper

General information
- Launched: August 10, 2017; 9 years ago
- Marketed by: AMD
- Designed by: AMD
- Common manufacturers: GlobalFoundries (14 nm and 12 nm only); TSMC (7 nm and beyond)

Performance
- Max. CPU clock rate: 4.2 GHz to 5.4 GHz

Physical specifications
- Cores: Threadripper 8–64 cores Threadripper Pro: 12–96 cores
- Socket: TR4; sTRX4; sWRX8; sTR5

Architecture and classification
- Technology node: 14 nm to 4 nm
- Microarchitecture: Zen microarchitecture: Zen; Zen+; Zen 2; Zen 3; Zen 4; Zen 5
- Instruction set: Main processor: x86-64 Platform Security Processor: ARM Cortex-A5
- Extensions: MMX(+), SSE1, SSE2, SSE3, SSSE3, SSE4a, SSE4.1, SSE4.2, AVX, AVX2, AVX-512 with Zen 4, FMA3, CVT16/F16C, ABM, BMI1, BMI2 AES, CLMUL, RDRAND, SHA, SME AMD-V, AMD-Vi

History
- Predecessor: Opteron

Threadripper, or Ryzen Threadripper, is a brand of high-end desktop (HEDT) multi-core x86-64 microprocessors designed and marketed by Advanced Micro Devices (AMD), and based on the Zen microarchitecture. It consists of central processing units (CPUs) and comes in two line-ups, Threadripper and Threadripper PRO.

== Background ==
Threadripper, which is geared for high-end desktops (HEDT), was not developed as part of a business plan or a specific roadmap. Instead, a small team inside AMD saw an opportunity to give AMD the lead in desktop CPU performance. After some progress was made in their spare time, the project was greenlit and put in an official roadmap by 2016.

== Characteristics ==
Threadripper chips have higher core counts, increased power requirements, support faster memory, and more expansion opportunities. These chips use larger sockets such as TR4, sTRX4, sWRX8, and sTR5 which support additional memory channels and PCI Express lanes. When compared to non-HEDT CPUs:

- Higher core count (up to 96 cores)
- Higher power consumption
- Additional memory channels
- Increased RAM capacity
- More PCIe lanes

=== Threadripper PRO ===
The Threadripper PRO line-up debuted with the 3000 series for workstations and adds support for increased RAM capacity (2 TB vs. 1 TB) and memory channels (eight channels vs. four channels) when compared to regular Threadripper. It is targeted at the workstation market.

== List of Ryzen Threadripper processors ==
=== Desktop ===
==== Whitehaven (Threadripper 1000 series, Zen based) ====
Common features of Ryzen 1000 HEDT CPUs:

- Socket: TR4.
- All the CPUs support DDR4-2666 in quad-channel mode.
- All the CPUs support 64 PCIe 3.0 lanes. 4 of the lanes are reserved as link to the chipset.
- No integrated graphics.
- L1 cache: 96 KB (32 KB data + 64 KB instruction) per core.
- L2 cache: 512 KB per core.
- Node/fabrication process: GlobalFoundries 14LP.

Branding and Model		Cores (threads)	Clock rate (GHz)			L3 cache (total)	TDP	Chiplets	Core config (Note: Core Complexes (CCX) × cores per CCX)	Release date	Launch price (Note: Manufacturer suggested retail price at launch)
Branding and Model		Cores (threads)	Base	PBO 1–4 (≥5)	XFR 1–2	L3 cache (total)	TDP	Chiplets	Core config	Release date	Launch price
Ryzen Threadripper	1950X	16 (32)	3.4	4.0 (3.7)	4.2	32 MB	180 W	2 × CCD (Note: Processor package actually contains two additional inactive dies to provide structural support to the integrated heat spreader.)	4 × 4	August 10, 2017	US $999
Ryzen Threadripper	1920X	12 (24)	3.5	4.0 (3.7)	4.2	32 MB	180 W	2 × CCD	4 × 3	August 10, 2017	US $799
Ryzen Threadripper	1900X	8 (16)	3.8	4.0 (3.9)	4.2	16 MB	180 W	2 × CCD	2 × 4	August 31, 2017	US $549

==== Colfax (Threadripper 2000 series, Zen+ based) ====
Common features of Ryzen 2000 HEDT CPUs:

- Socket: TR4.
- All the CPUs support DDR4-2933 in quad-channel mode.
- All the CPUs support 64 PCIe 3.0 lanes. 4 of the lanes are reserved as link to the chipset.
- No integrated graphics.
- L1 cache: 96 KB (32 KB data + 64 KB instruction) per core.
- L2 cache: 512 KB per core.
- Fabrication process: GlobalFoundries 12LP (14LP+).

Branding and Model		Cores (threads)	Clock rate (GHz)		L3 cache (total)	TDP	Chiplets	Core config (Note: Core Complexes (CCX) × cores per CCX)	Release date	Launch price (Note: Manufacturer suggested retail price at launch)
Branding and Model		Cores (threads)	Base	PB2	L3 cache (total)	TDP	Chiplets	Core config	Release date	Launch price
Ryzen Threadripper	2990WX	32 (64)	3.0	4.2	64 MB	250 W	4 × CCD	8 × 4	Aug 13, 2018	US $1799
Ryzen Threadripper	2970WX	24 (48)	3.0	4.2	64 MB	250 W	4 × CCD	8 × 3	Oct 2018	US $1299
Ryzen Threadripper	2950X	16 (32)	3.5	4.4	32 MB	180 W	2 × CCD	4 × 4	Aug 31, 2018	US $899
Ryzen Threadripper	2920X	12 (24)	3.5	4.3	32 MB	180 W	2 × CCD	4 × 3	Oct 2018	US $649

==== Castle Peak (Threadripper 3000 series, Zen 2 based) ====
Common features of Ryzen 3000 HEDT/workstation CPUs:

- Socket: sTRX4 (Threadripper), sWRX8 (Threadripper PRO).
- Threadripper CPUs support DDR4-3200 in quad-channel mode while Threadripper PRO CPUs support DDR4-3200 in octa-channel mode.
- L1 cache: 64 KB (32 KB data + 32 KB instruction) per core.
- L2 cache: 512 KB per core.
- Threadripper CPUs support 64 PCIe 4.0 lanes while Threadripper PRO CPUs support 128 PCIe 4.0 lanes. 8 of the lanes are reserved as link to the chipset.
- No integrated graphics.
- Fabrication process: TSMC 7FF.

Branding and Model		Cores (threads)	Clock rate (GHz)		L3 cache (total)	TDP	Chiplets	Core config (Note: Core Complexes (CCXs) × cores per CCX)	Release date	MSRP
Branding and Model		Cores (threads)	Base	Boost	L3 cache (total)	TDP	Chiplets	Core config	Release date	MSRP
Ryzen Threadripper PRO	3995WX	64 (128)	2.7	4.2	256 MB	280 W (Note: Ryzen Threadripper 3990X may consume over 490 W under load.)	8 × CCD; 1 × I/OD	16 × 4	Jul 14, 2020	
Ryzen Threadripper PRO	3975WX	32 (64)	3.5	4.2	128 MB	280 W	4 × CCD; 1 × I/OD	8 × 4	Jul 14, 2020	
Ryzen Threadripper PRO	3955WX	16 (32)	3.9	4.3	64 MB	280 W	2 × CCD; 1 × I/OD	4 × 4	Jul 14, 2020	
Ryzen Threadripper PRO	3945WX	12 (24)	4.0	4.3	64 MB	280 W	2 × CCD; 1 × I/OD	4 × 3	Jul 14, 2020	
Ryzen Threadripper	3990X	64 (128)	2.9	4.3	256 MB	280 W	8 × CCD; 1 × I/OD	16 × 4	Feb 7, 2020	US $3990
Ryzen Threadripper	3970X	32 (64)	3.7	4.5	128 MB	280 W	4 × CCD; 1 × I/OD	8 × 4	Nov 25, 2019	US $1999
Ryzen Threadripper	3960X	24 (48)	3.8	4.5	128 MB	280 W	4 × CCD; 1 × I/OD	8 × 3	Nov 25, 2019	US $1399

==== Chagall (Threadripper 5000 series, Zen 3 based) ====
Common features of Ryzen 5000 workstation CPUs:

- Socket: sWRX8.
- All the CPUs support DDR4-3200 in octa-channel mode.
- L1 cache: 64 KB (32 KB data + 32 KB instruction) per core.
- L2 cache: 512 KB per core.
- All the CPUs support 128 PCIe 4.0 lanes. 8 of the lanes are reserved as link to the chipset.
- No integrated graphics.
- Fabrication process: TSMC 7FF.

Branding and Model		Cores (threads)	Clock rate (GHz)		L3 cache (total)	TDP	Chiplets	Core config (Note: Core Complexes (CCX) × cores per CCX)	Release date	MSRP
Branding and Model		Cores (threads)	Base	Boost	L3 cache (total)	TDP	Chiplets	Core config	Release date	MSRP
Ryzen Threadripper PRO	5995WX	64 (128)	2.7	4.5	256 MB	280 W	8 × CCD; 1 × I/OD	8 × 8	Mar 8, 2022 (OEM) / ? (retail)	OEM / US $6500
Ryzen Threadripper PRO	5975WX	32 (64)	3.6	4.5	128 MB	280 W	4 × CCD; 1 × I/OD	4 × 8	Mar 8, 2022 (OEM) / ? (retail)	OEM / US $3300
Ryzen Threadripper PRO	5965WX	24 (48)	3.8	4.5	128 MB	280 W	4 × CCD; 1 × I/OD	4 × 6	Mar 8, 2022 (OEM) / ? (retail)	OEM / US $2400
Ryzen Threadripper PRO	5955WX	16 (32)	4.0	4.5	64 MB	280 W	2 × CCD; 1 × I/OD	2 × 8	Mar 8, 2022	OEM
Ryzen Threadripper PRO	5945WX	12 (24)	4.1	4.5	64 MB	280 W	2 × CCD; 1 × I/OD	2 × 6	Mar 8, 2022	OEM

==== Storm Peak (Threadripper 7000 series, Zen 4 based) ====
Common features of Ryzen 7000 HEDT/workstation CPUs:

- Socket: sTR5.
- Threadripper CPUs support DDR5-5200 in quad-channel mode while Threadripper PRO CPUs support DDR5-5200 in octa-channel mode with ECC support.
- L1 cache: 64 KB (32 KB data + 32 KB instruction) per core.
- L2 cache: 1 MB per core.
- Threadripper CPUs support 48 PCIe 5.0 and 24 PCIe 4.0 lanes while Threadripper PRO CPUs support 128 PCIe 5.0 lanes. In addition, all processor models have 4 PCIe 4.0 lanes reserved as link to the chipset.
- No integrated graphics.
- Fabrication process: TSMC 5FF.

Branding and model		Cores (threads)	Clock rate (GHz)		L3 cache (total)	TDP	Chiplets	Core config (Note: Core Complexes (CCXs) × cores per CCX)	Release date	MSRP
Branding and model		Cores (threads)	Base	Boost	L3 cache (total)	TDP	Chiplets	Core config	Release date	MSRP
Ryzen Threadripper PRO	7995WX	96 (192)	2.5	5.1	384 MB	350 W	12 × CCD; 1 × I/OD	12 × 8	Nov 21, 2023	US $9999
Ryzen Threadripper PRO	7985WX	64 (128)	3.2	5.1	256 MB	350 W	8 × CCD; 1 × I/OD	8 × 8	Nov 21, 2023	US $7349
Ryzen Threadripper PRO	7975WX	32 (64)	4.0	5.3	128 MB	350 W	4 × CCD; 1 × I/OD	4 × 8	Nov 21, 2023	US $3899
Ryzen Threadripper PRO	7965WX	24 (48)	4.2	5.3	128 MB	350 W	4 × CCD; 1 × I/OD	4 × 6	Nov 21, 2023	US $2649
Ryzen Threadripper PRO	7955WX	16 (32)	4.5	5.3	64 MB	350 W	2 × CCD; 1 × I/OD	2 × 8	Nov 21, 2023	US $1899
Ryzen Threadripper PRO	7945WX	12 (24)	4.7	5.3	64 MB	350 W	2 × CCD; 1 × I/OD	2 × 6	Nov 21, 2023	US $1399
Ryzen Threadripper	7980X	64 (128)	3.2	5.1	256 MB	350 W	8 × CCD; 1 × I/OD	8 × 8	Nov 21, 2023	US $4999
Ryzen Threadripper	7970X	32 (64)	4.0	5.3	128 MB	350 W	4 × CCD; 1 × I/OD	4 × 8	Nov 21, 2023	US $2499
Ryzen Threadripper	7960X	24 (48)	4.2	5.3	128 MB	350 W	4 × CCD; 1 × I/OD	4 × 6	Nov 21, 2023	US $1499

==== Shimada Peak (Threadripper 9000 series, Zen 5 based) ====
Common features of Ryzen 9000 HEDT/workstation CPUs:

- Socket: sTR5.
- Threadripper CPUs support DDR5-6400 in quad-channel mode while Threadripper PRO CPUs support DDR5-6400 in octa-channel mode with ECC support.
- L1 cache: 80 KB (48 KB data + 32 KB instruction) per core.
- L2 cache: 1 MB per core.
- Threadripper CPUs support 80 PCIe 5.0 lanes (4 of which runs PCIe 4.0 mode to the chipset; and remaining are usually running as 48 PCIe 5.0 lanes plus 24 PCIe 4.0 lanes), while Threadripper PRO CPUs support 128 PCIe 5.0 lanes (4 of which runs in PCIe 4.0 mode to the chipset), and extra 8 PCIe 3.0 lanes. Some lanes support alternative mode of running SATA3.
- No integrated graphics.
- Fabrication process: TSMC 4FFX.

Branding and model		Cores (threads)	Clock rate (GHz)		L3 cache (total)	TDP	Chiplets	Core config (Note: Core Complexes (CCXs) × cores per CCX)	Release date	MSRP
Branding and model		Cores (threads)	Base	Boost	L3 cache (total)	TDP	Chiplets	Core config	Release date	MSRP
Ryzen Threadripper PRO	9995WX	96 (192)	2.5	5.4	384 MB	350 W	12 × CCD; 1 × I/OD	12 × 8	July 2025	$11,699
Ryzen Threadripper PRO	9985WX	64 (128)	3.2	5.4	256 MB	350 W	8 × CCD; 1 × I/OD	8 × 8	July 2025	$7,999
Ryzen Threadripper PRO	9975WX	32 (64)	4.0	5.4	128 MB	350 W	4 × CCD; 1 × I/OD	4 × 8	July 2025	$4,099
Ryzen Threadripper PRO	9965WX	24 (48)	4.2	5.4	128 MB	350 W	4 × CCD; 1 × I/OD	4 × 6	July 2025	$2,899
Ryzen Threadripper PRO	9955WX	16 (32)	4.5	5.4	64 MB	350 W	2 × CCD; 1 × I/OD	2 × 8	July 2025	$1,649
Ryzen Threadripper PRO	9945WX	12 (24)	4.7	5.4	64 MB	350 W	2 × CCD; 1 × I/OD	2 × 6	July 2025	OEM
Ryzen Threadripper	9980X	64 (128)	3.2	5.4	256 MB	350 W	8 × CCD; 1 × I/OD	8 × 8	July 2025	$4,999
Ryzen Threadripper	9970X	32 (64)	4.0	5.4	128 MB	350 W	4 × CCD; 1 × I/OD	4 × 8	July 2025	$2,499
Ryzen Threadripper	9960X	24 (48)	4.2	5.4	128 MB	350 W	4 × CCD; 1 × I/OD	4 × 6	July 2025	$1,499

== See also ==
- List of AMD Epyc processors
- List of AMD FX processors
- List of AMD Opteron processors
- List of AMD Ryzen processors
