= Qualcomm Centriq =

Brand of SoCs by Qualcomm

Centriq
General information
- Launched: 2017
- Marketed by: Qualcomm
- Designed by: Qualcomm
- Common manufacturer: Samsung

Architecture and classification
- Instructions: ARMv8-A

Physical specifications
- Cores: up to 48

Products, models, variants
- Core name: Falkor

Centriq (/sɛnˈtriːk/ sen-TREEK) is a brand of system on a chip (SoC) semiconductor products designed and marketed by Qualcomm for data centers. The Centriq central processing unit (CPU) uses the ARM RISC instruction set, with multiple CPU cores in a single chip.

== History ==
=== Pre-release ===
In November 2014, Qualcomm announced it was developing an ARM ARMv8-A microarchitecture based CPU that was purpose-built for data centers. In December 2016, the company announced and demonstrated the first multi-core CPUs based on a custom ARM ARMv8-A microarchitecture.

=== Early products ===
The first Centriq 2400 series of products were made available to server manufacturers in November 2017. With these first products, Qualcomm introduced its "Falkor" ARMv8-A microarchitecture. The chip has up to 48 of Qualcomm's custom designed "Falkor" cores at up to 2.6GHz, with six-channel DDR4 memory and a 60 MB L3 cache.

== Market environment ==
A number of reviews have noted at its release that the Centriq is expected to face significant competition from established x86-64 data-center CPU manufacturers Intel and AMD, and ARM microarchitecture server products such as Cavium's ThunderX2. In addition to competitive pressures, it has been noted that running established workloads on ARM microarchitectures requires re-optimizing and recompiling the software, or x86-64 emulation, presenting a barrier to entry for some potential customers.
