= Socket sTRX4 =

CPU socket for HEDT AMD CPUs

- Type: LGA-ZIF
- Chip form factors: Flip-chip
- Contacts: 4,094
- FSB protocol: PCI Express, Infinity Fabric
- Processor dimensions: 58.5mm x 75.4mm 4410.9 mm^{2}
- Processors: Ryzen Threadripper: Castle Peak
- Predecessor: TR4
- Variant: sWRX8 (SP3r4)
- Successor: sTR5
- Memory support: DDR4
- This article is part of the CPU socket series

Socket sTRX4, also known as Socket SP3r3, is a land grid array (LGA) CPU socket designed by AMD supporting its Zen 2-based third-generation Ryzen Threadripper desktop processors, launched on November 25, 2019, for the high-end desktop and workstation platforms.

Socket sTRX4 is the direct successor to Socket TR4 used in the first- and second-generation Ryzen Threadripper products. It is physically identical to, but electrically incompatible with, both TR4 and AMD's server Socket SP3.

While Socket SP3 doesn't require a chipset, instead utilizing a system-on-a-chip design, Socket sTRX4 and its predecessor require a chipset to provide improved connectivity and functionality. For Socket sTRX4, the TRX40 chipset was developed, which provides a total of 88 PCIe 4.0 lanes, an increase from the 66 PCIe 3.0 lanes on its predecessor platform. Also it no longer features a built-in High Definition Audio interface; instead motherboard manufacturers are including a separate audio controller on board to provide audio functionality. AMD promised long-term support for socket sTRX4. Despite this, AMD only gave it one generation of CPUs before pausing the regular Ryzen Threadripper lineup (the only product to ever use sTRX4) and producing only the Threadripper Pro CPUs on socket sWRX8.

== See also ==
- Ryzen
- Socket AM5
