= Socket SP3 =

CPU socket for AMD CPUs

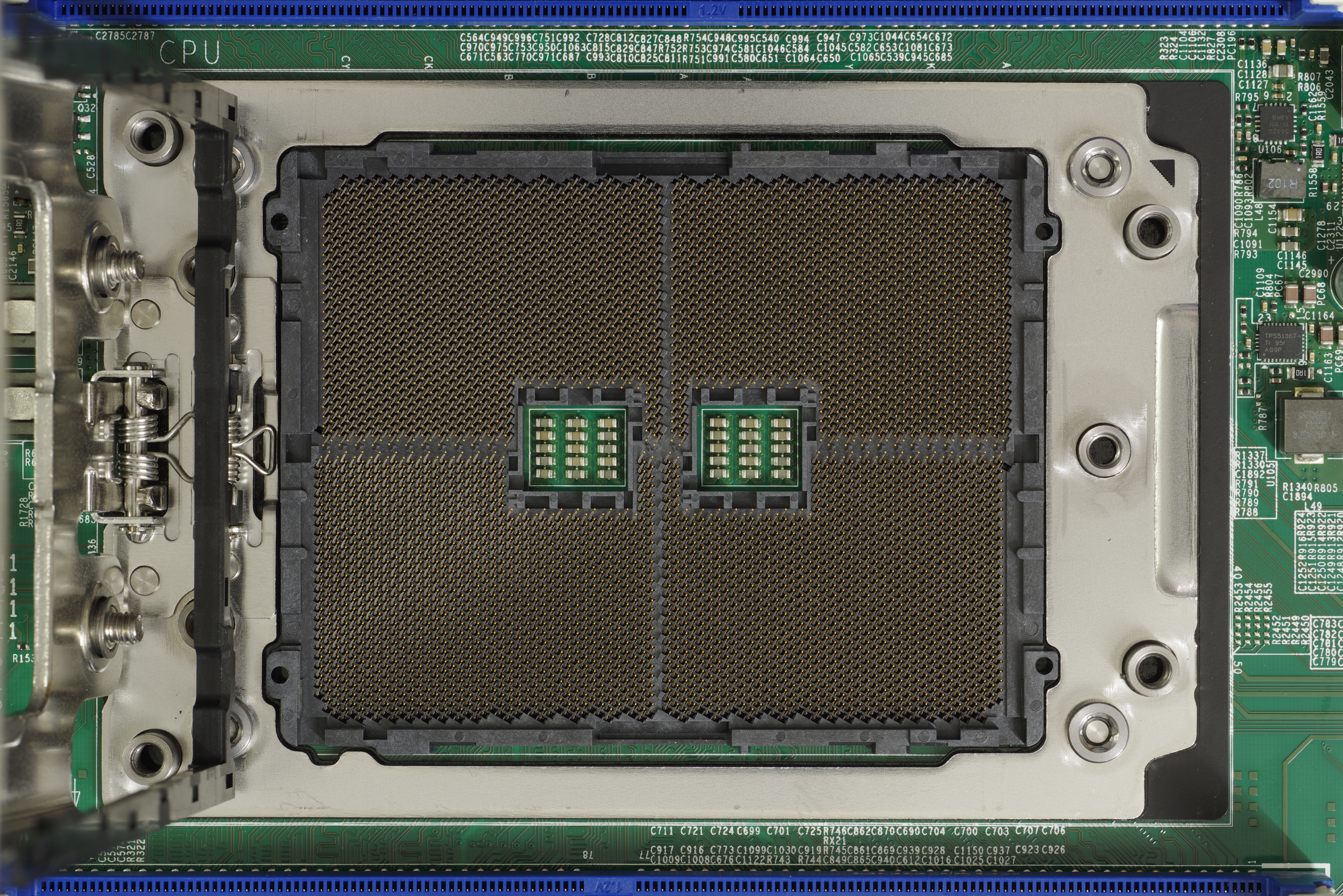
- Release date: June 20, 2017
- Designed by: AMD
- Manufactured by: Lotes; Foxconn
- Type: LGA-ZIF
- Chip form factors: Flip-chip
- Contacts: 4094
- FSB protocol: PCI Express, Infinity Fabric
- Voltage range: 1.8V (Threadripper); 1.3V (EPYC)
- Processor dimensions: 58.5mm x 75.4mm 4410.9 mm^{2}
- Processors: Epyc: Naples; Rome; Milan
- Predecessor: Socket C32; Socket G34
- Successor: Socket SP5; Socket SP6
- Memory support: ECC DDR4
- This article is part of the CPU socket series

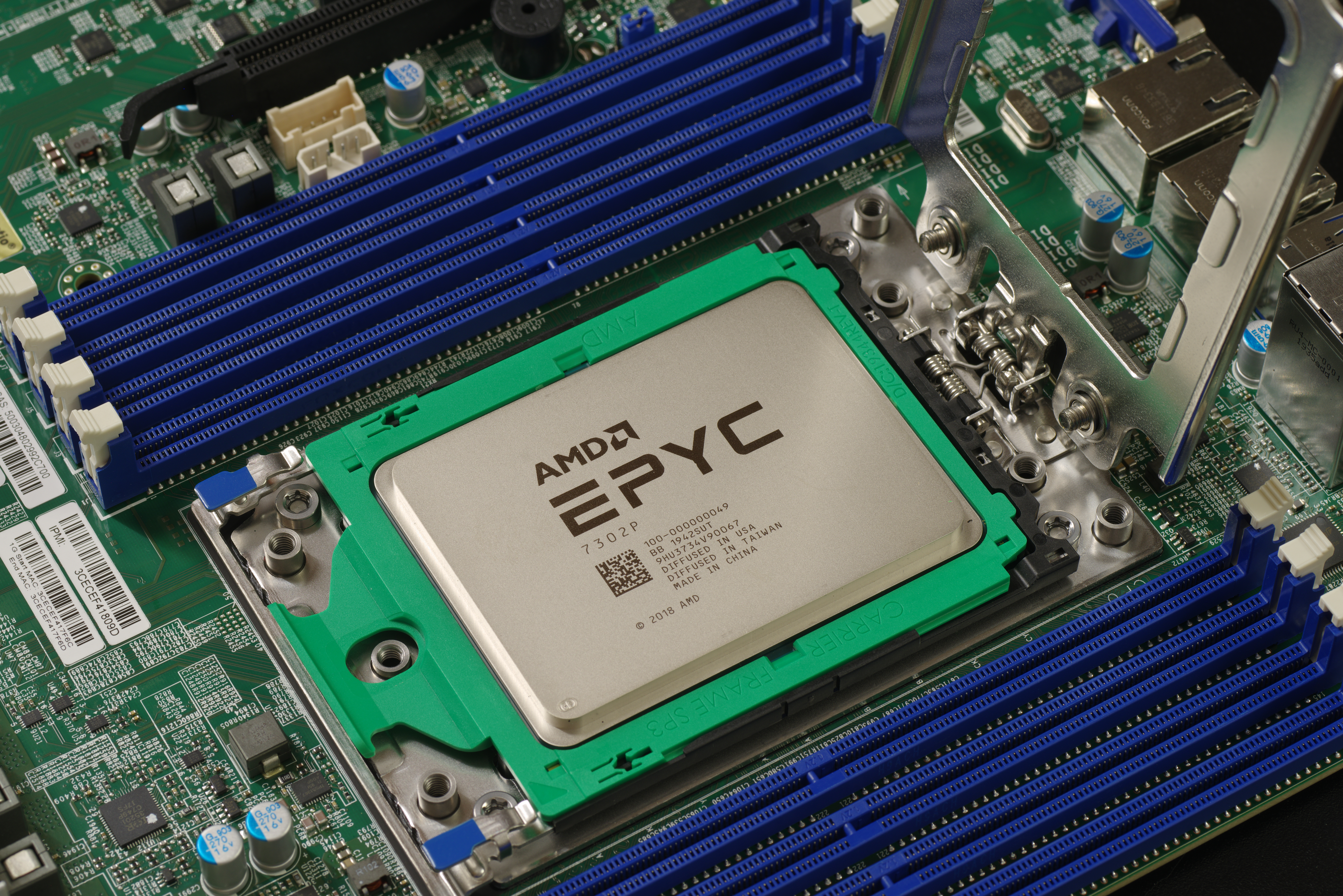
An SP3 socket with an EPYC CPU installed

Socket SP3 is a zero insertion force land grid array CPU socket designed by AMD supporting its Zen-, Zen 2- and Zen 3-based Epyc server processors, launched on June 20, 2017. Because the socket is physically the same size as socket TR4 and socket sTRX4, users can use CPU coolers not only designed for SP3 but also coolers designed for TR4 and sTRX4.

Socket SP3 is a system in a package socket - that means most features required to make the system fully functional (such as memory, PCI Express, SATA controllers, etc.) are fully integrated into the processor package, eliminating the need for a chipset to be placed on a motherboard. Variants for desktop platforms (as said below) are, eventually, requiring an additional chipset to unlock the functionality of the CPU. A processor using socket SP3 is mounted by inserting the CPU into a slide and fixing the slide assembly by tightening three screws using the torque wrenches normally provided alongside the motherboard. Automated processor mounting tools in OEMs do not use the slide, instead relying upon the precise movement of the robot arm.

== Socket SP3r2 ==
Socket TR4, also known as Socket SP3r2, is used for high-end desktop CPUs. It is physically identical to a normal SP3 socket with some connections disabled. A TR4 socket will prevent the use of CPUs designed for Socket SP3 with an ID pin.

== Socket SP3r3 ==
Socket sTRX4, also known as Socket SP3r3, used for third-generation Ryzen Threadripper (Threadripper 3000X) high-end desktop CPUs, is physically identical to the normal SP3 socket with some connections disabled, and is the successor to Socket TR4 (SP3r2).

== Socket SP3r4 ==
Socket sWRX8, also known as Socket SP3r4, is used for Ryzen Threadripper Pro 3000WX and Ryzen Threadripper Pro 5000WX workstation desktop CPUs. It is physically identical to the normal SP3 socket, with some connections repurposed.

== See also ==
- Socket AM4, contemporary desktop socket from AMD
- Socket P, contemporary server socket from Intel
