= Socket TR4 =

CPU socket for HEDT AMD CPUs

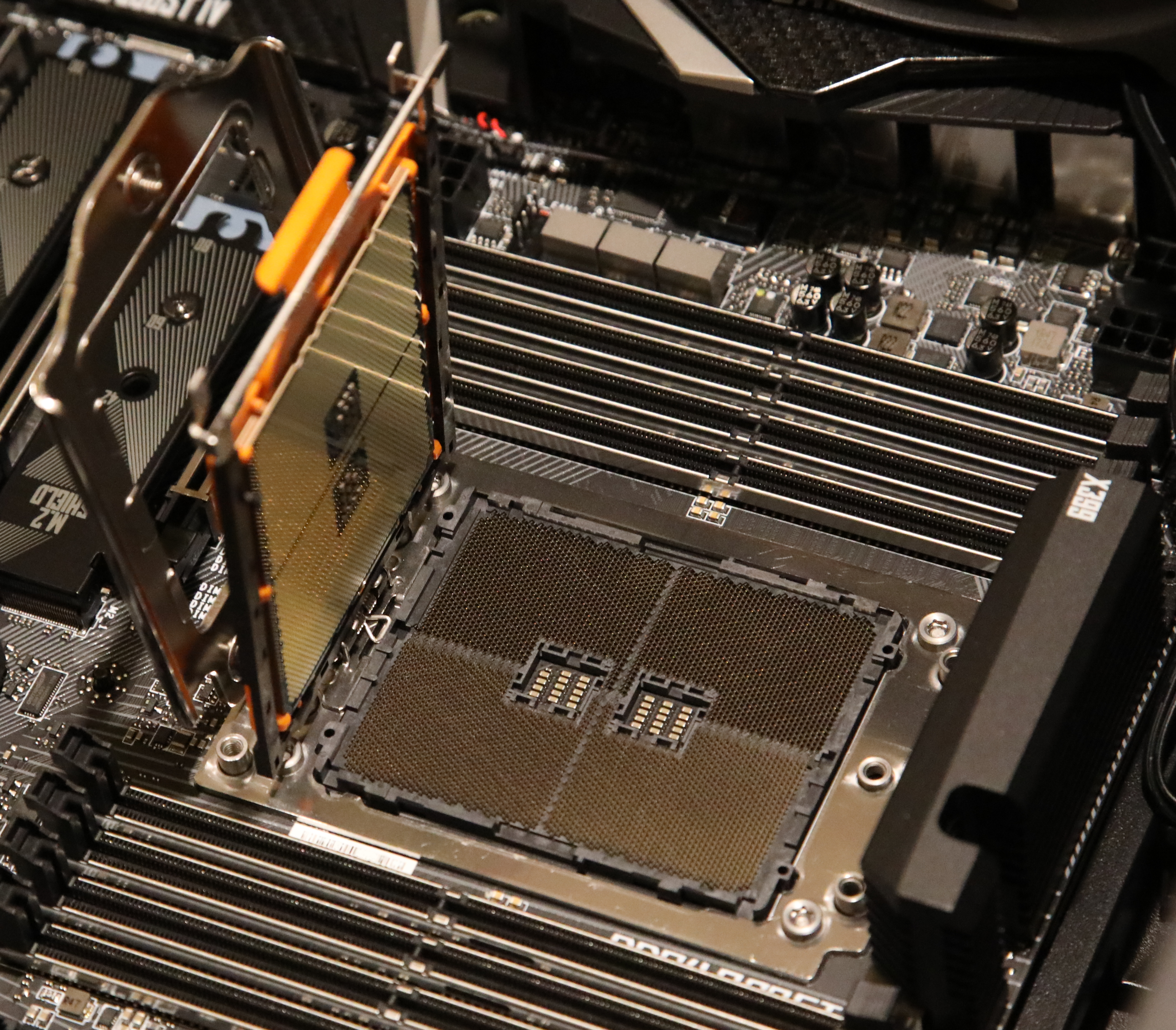
- Type: LGA-ZIF
- Chip form factors: Flip-chip
- Contacts: 4094
- FSB protocol: PCI Express, Infinity Fabric
- Processor dimensions: 58.5mm x 75.4mm 4410.9 mm^{2}
- Processors: Ryzen Threadripper: Whitehaven; Colfax
- Successor: sTRX4
- Memory support: DDR4
- This article is part of the CPU socket series

Socket TR4, also known as Socket SP3r2, is a zero insertion force land grid array (LGA) CPU socket designed by AMD supporting its first- and second-generation Zen-based Ryzen Threadripper desktop processors, launched on August 10, 2017 for the high-end desktop and workstation platforms. It was succeeded by Socket sTRX4 for the third generation of Ryzen Threadripper processors.

TR4 is AMD's second LGA socket for a consumer product after the short lived Socket 1207 FX. It is physically identical to, but electrically incompatible with both AMD's server Socket SP3, and TR4's successor, Socket sTRX4.

While the SP3 server socket does not require a chipset, instead utilizing a system-on-a-chip design, TR4 and its successor HEDT sockets require a chipset to unlock the features of the CPU. For TR4, the AMD X399 chipset was released, which allows a total of 64 PCIe 3.0 lanes for quad SLI/CrossFire configurations.

The socket is made by both Foxconn and Lotes.

== See also ==
- Ryzen
- Socket AM4
