= Nvidia System Tools =

Discontinued collection of utilities

- Developer: Nvidia
- Final release: 6.08 / December 19, 2011; 14 years ago
- Operating system: Windows XP, Windows Vista, Windows 7
- Size: 71.8 MB
- Type: Overclocking
- License: Freeware
- Website: Nvidia System Tools

Nvidia System Tools (previously called nTune) is a discontinued collection of utilities for accessing, monitoring, and adjusting system components, including temperatures and voltages, through a graphical user interface in Windows rather than the BIOS.

System Tools also includes a feature that automatically adjusts and tests configurations to determine an optimal combination for a particular computer hardware setup. It can modify the graphics processing unit (GPU), central processing unit (CPU), Media Communications Processor (MCP), RAM, voltages, and fan settings, although motherboard support varies.

Configurations can be saved, allowing the end user to switch between gaming, quiet, or other usage-specific profiles.

Nvidia System Tools also functions as a front end for the BIOS, exposing many BIOS settings through its utilities. BIOS and driver updates for nForce and GeForce hardware can also be performed through the software. It additionally supports hardware certified under the Enthusiast System Architecture, connecting to the motherboard via USB.

Since the release of the GeForce 600 series, Nvidia System Tools has been replaced by third-party utilities with similar functionality, such as MSI Afterburner.

== Previously supported motherboard chipsets ==
The following chipsets were supported in nTune releases, but are no longer supported by Nvidia System Tools.

- nForce 220, nForce 220D, nForce 415 and nForce 420D
- nForce2 and nForce2 400
- nForce2 Ultra and nForce2 Ultra 400
- nForce2 400R and nForce2 Ultra 400Gb
- nForce3 150 and nForce3 PRO 150
- nForce3 250, nForce3 250Gb and nForce3 PRO 250

== Currently supported hardware ==
Nvidia System Tools supports graphics processing units from the following series of graphics processing units.

- GeForce 5 FX
- GeForce 6
- GeForce 7
- GeForce 8
- GeForce 9
- GeForce 200
- GeForce 400
- GeForce 500

It also supports certain chipsets, such as the 680i SLI and 680i LT SLI from the nForce 6 series, and the 790i Ultra SLI, 790i SLI, 780i SLI, and 780a SLI from the nForce 7 series.

Preceded by Coolbits	NVIDIA Overclocking	Succeeded by -
