= Coolbits =

Coolbits was a Windows registry hack for Nvidia graphics cards Windows drivers, that allows tweaking features via the Nvidia driver control panel (including overclocking). There is also a Coolbits 2.0, with extra features. These features provided by Coolbits are considered expert-only and thus the reason they are normally hidden in the control panel.

Below is the main Coolbits activation entry in the registry:

[HKEY_LOCAL_MACHINE\SOFTWARE\NVIDIA Corporation\Global\NvTweak]
"CoolBits"=dword:00000003 

It is also available on Unix-like systems running the X Window System by setting the "Coolbits" option to "5" in the configuration file. Using "28" instead of "5" will enable additional overclocking features.

Preceded by -	NVIDIA Overclocking	Succeeded by NVIDIA System Tools
