= AMD Quad FX platform =

Enthusiast platform by AMD

The AMD Quad FX platform is an AMD platform targeted at enthusiasts which allows users to plug two Socket F Athlon 64 FX or 2-way Opteron processors (CPUs) into a single motherboard for a total of four physical cores. This is a type of dual processor setup, where two CPUs are installed on a motherboard to increase computing power. The major difference between the platform and past dual processor systems like Xeon (pre Intel 5000X/P chipset) is that each processor has its own dedicated memory stores. The Quad FX platform also has HyperTransport capability targeted toward consumer platforms.

In May 2007, AMD officially codenamed the eight core setup with two Phenom FX processors to be the FASN8 (pronounced as "fascinate", /ˈfæsɪneɪt/, in short for First AMD Silicon Next-gen 8-core Platform) from the previous codename "4x4+" used in Analyst Day presentations.

== Configuration ==
In each socket resides an AMD Athlon 64 FX CPU. Each socket is connected using AMD's Direct Chip Module, this dual-processor architecture was dubbed by AMD as the "Dual Socket Direct Connect Architecture" (DSDC Architecture), providing a dedicated channel between the CPU cores and from each CPU out to the system memory. Due to the nature of the Direct Connect architecture, each CPU can access the other's dedicated memory store. The both of them, constituting one four-core system, have a power consumption (TDP) of 250 W for each 125 W labelled TDP.

AMD first announced the platform as "Socket 4x4" on June 1, 2006, citing customer feedback for such a system. A four-core system has been exhibited as a demo at AMD headquarters on July 25, 2006. AMD has claimed that the systems which consist of a pair of CPUs will cost below US$1000 altogether with a suitable motherboard. The motherboards strongly resemble dual-socket Opteron 22xx series motherboards as they share the same socket and one bank of memory DIMMs per CPU, but the motherboards of the platform have support for regular unbuffered DDR2 RAM while the Opteron setup requires registered memory. The platform also has support for multiple graphics cards.

An eight core reference system was demonstrated in an event held early May 2007 by AMD.

== Competing products ==
The major competition of the platform is from Intel, which launched its Core 2 Duo desktop microprocessors in late July 2006 and its multi-chip module quad-core processor codenamed "Kentsfield" in November 2006 as the Core 2 Extreme series.

Intel had also responded in 2007 with two upcoming platforms, one in CeBIT codenamed V8, targeting workstation market and one in 2007 Beijing Intel Developer Forum (IDF), codenamed Skulltrail for enthusiasts, both with similar dual-processor configuration but with V8 lacking multi-graphics support.

== Reception ==
Reviews of the platform have been largely unfavourable. Reviewers have noted that the platform requires significantly more power than a Core 2 Extreme QX6700 processor system, with performance being generally inferior. In some cases, performance was seen to be even lower than the dual-core FX-62, which has been blamed on higher memory latency introduced by the platform's use of Non-Uniform Memory Access.

== Availability ==
The platform was launched in November 2006. Three new processors, the FX-70, FX-72 and FX-74 are released simultaneously with clock speeds of 2.6 GHz, 2.8 GHz and 3.0 GHz respectively. FX-76, clocked at speed of 3.2 GHz, was scheduled to be released in 2007, but was cancelled for the newer 65 nm microarchitecture Phenom FX processors replacing the 90 nm fabrication process line of Athlon 64 FX series processor.

=== Chipsets ===
==== Nvidia ====
Nvidia has introduced a chipset for the platform, called "nForce 680a", provides 4 PCI-Express slots of x16-x8-x16-x8 configuration, and support up to 12 SATA 3.0 Gbit/s hard disks. ASUSteK will produce the first motherboard that will support two Socket F (dubbed as socket L1FX by Nvidia) processors each with its own dedicated memory banks, dubbed as "ASUS L1N64-SLI WS" (instead of the L1N64-SLI Deluxe that Nvidia announced), based on Nvidia nForce 680a chipset.

Reports suggested that ASUStek is the sole motherboard manufacturer for the chipset and left other motherboard manufacturers out, some of which stated that they will produce motherboards based on Intel chipsets instead. There are also reports showing that the L1N64-SLI WS motherboard supports a pair of 2200 series CPU in the Opteron family without modifications to the motherboard, and the chipset was recognized as "nForce 570 SLI" chipset revision A1 instead of "nForce 680a" chipset.

==== ATI Technologies/AMD ====
In October 2006, sites leaked ATI chipset updates that ATI will also introduce a chipset connecting two AMD processors and four PCI-Express graphic cards, dubbed as "790FX chipset" (codenamed RD790), which provides PCI Express slots of x8-x8-x8-x8 configuration, and was available during the first half of 2007. In September and October 2007 news sites reported that AMD had dropped Quad Phenom from their road maps.

Source also revealed that a revamped "580X" chipset, which is due first half of 2007, will allow two CPUs and at most three graphic cards to run on the same board, but was obviously cancelled as AMD demonstrated the 790FX chipset recently in internal events and Computex 2007 instead of a revamped 580X chipset.

=== System builders ===
After the platform launched in November, AMD provided a list of System Builders, which had announced PC systems for the platform, including Vigor Gaming, IBuyPower, CyberPowerPC, MainGear and Velocity Micro.

American-based system builder, Alienware, a subsidiary of Dell Computers announced that there would be a system using the platform once the product released, however, none of the expected product line-up were officially released.

Another system builder, VoodooPC, subsidiary of Hewlett-Packard, demonstrated an Omen PC, supporting the platform at CES 2007. With a similar system featuring Dual CPU configuration dubbed as the Omen a:221 SIlent DCC workstation, equipping two Opteron 200 or 800 series CPU dated back to 2006, and the "OMEN AMD Quad FX SLI" system was announced later in the year.

Several system integrators also announced special Quad FX themed platforms, most notably Vigor Gaming's Force Recon QX4 "Quadfather" system.

== Future updates ==
AMD announced on Analyst Day that, sometime during 2008, users should be able to use two, future quad-core AMD processors using the chipset, providing a total of eight physical cores, dubbed as "4x4++" with DDR3 support. Additionally, backward compatible AMD quad-cores would also support an update to HyperTransport which would benefit more from a new chipset released at the same time.

The eight-core variant has never materialized, since AMD cancelled development of the platform in 2007.
