= Serial presence detect =

Standardized way to automatically access information about a memory module

In computing, serial presence detect (SPD) is a standardized way to automatically access information about a memory module. Earlier 72-pin SIMMs included five pins that provided five bits of parallel presence detect (PPD) data, but the 168-pin DIMM standard changed to a serial presence detect to encode more information.

When an ordinary modern computer is turned on, it starts by doing a power-on self-test (POST). Since about the mid-1990s, this process includes automatically configuring the hardware currently present. SPD is a memory hardware feature that makes it possible for the computer to know what memory is present, and what memory timings to use to access the memory.

Some computers adapt to hardware changes completely automatically. In most cases, there is a special optional procedure for accessing BIOS parameters, to view and potentially make changes in settings. It may be possible to control how the computer uses the memory SPD data—to choose settings, selectively modify memory timings, or possibly to completely override the SPD data (see overclocking).

== Stored information ==
For a memory module to support SPD, the JEDEC standards require that certain parameters be in the lower 128 (or more, depending on the generation) bytes of an EEPROM located on the memory module. These bytes contain timing parameters, manufacturer, serial number and other useful information about the module. Devices utilizing the memory automatically determine key parameters of the module by reading this information. For example, the SPD data on an SDRAM module might provide information about the CAS latency so the system can set this correctly without user intervention.

The SPD EEPROM firmware is accessed using SMBus, a variant of the I^{2}C protocol. This reduces the number of communication pins on the module to just two: a clock signal and a data signal. The EEPROM shares ground pins with the RAM, has its own power pin, and has three additional pins (SA0–2) to identify the slot, which are used to assign the EEPROM a unique address in the range 0x50–0x57. Not only can the communication lines be shared among 8 memory modules, the same SMBus is commonly used on motherboards for system health monitoring tasks such as reading power supply voltages, CPU temperatures, and fan speeds.

Before SPD, memory chips were spotted with parallel presence detect (PPD). PPD used a separate pin for each bit of information, which meant that only the speed and density of the memory module could be stored because of the limited space for pins.

=== SDR SDRAM ===
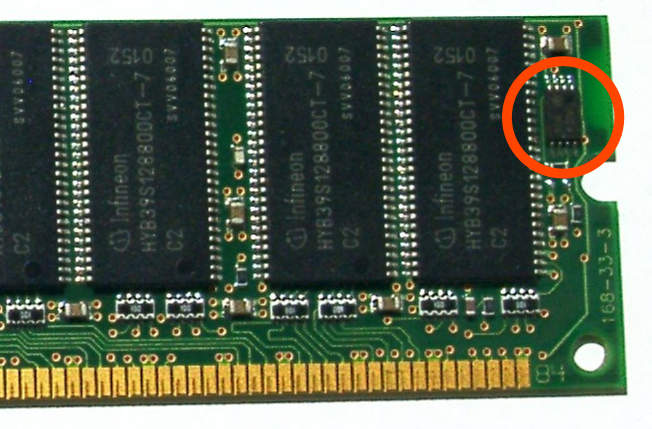
Memory device on an SDRAM module, containing SPD data (red circled)

The first SPD specification was issued by JEDEC and tightened up by Intel as part of its PC100 memory specification introduced in 1998. Most values specified are in binary-coded decimal form. The most significant nibble can contain values from 10 to 15, and in some cases extends higher. In such cases, the encodings for 1, 2 and 3 are instead used to encode 16, 17 and 18. A most significant nibble of 0 is reserved to represent "undefined".

The SPD ROM defines up to three DRAM timings, for three CAS latencies specified by set bits in byte 18. First comes the highest CAS latency (fastest clock), then two lower CAS latencies with progressively lower clock speeds.

SPD contents for SDR SDRAM
| Byte | | Bit | | | | | | | | Notes |
| (dec.) | (hex.) | 7 | 6 | 5 | 4 | 3 | 2 | 1 | 0 | Notes |
|---|---|---|---|---|---|---|---|---|---|---|
| 0 | 0x00 | Number of bytes present | | | | | | | | Typically 128 |
| 1 | 0x01 | log_{2}(size of SPD EEPROM) | | | | | | | | Typically 8 (256 bytes) |
| 2 | 0x02 | Basic memory type (4: SPD SDRAM) | | | | | | | | |
| 3 | 0x03 | Bank 2 row address bits (0–15) | | | | Bank 1 row address bits (1–15) | | | | Bank 2 is 0 if same as bank 1 |
| 4 | 0x04 | Bank 2 column address bits (0–15) | | | | Bank 1 column address bits (1–15) | | | | Bank 2 is 0 if same as bank 1 |
| 5 | 0x05 | Number of RAM banks on module (1–255) | | | | | | | | Commonly 1 or 2 |
| 6 | 0x06 | Module data width low byte | | | | | | | | Commonly 64, or 72 for ECC DIMMs |
| 7 | 0x07 | Module data width high byte | | | | | | | | 0, unless width ≥ 256 bits |
| 8 | 0x08 | Interface voltage level of this assembly (not the same as V_{cc} supply voltage) (0–4) | | | | | | | | Decoded by table lookup |
| 9 | 0x09 | Nanoseconds (0–15) | | | | Tenths of nanoseconds (0.0–0.9) | | | | Clock cycle time at highest CAS latency |
| 10 | 0x0a | Nanoseconds (0–15) | | | | Tenths of nanoseconds (0.0–0.9) | | | | SDRAM access time from clock (t_{AC}) |
| 11 | 0x0b | DIMM configuration type (0–2): non-ECC, parity, ECC | | | | | | | | Table lookup |
| 12 | 0x0c | Self | Refresh period (0–5): 64, 256, 128, 32, 16, 8 kHz | | | | | | | Refresh requirements |
| 13 | 0x0d | Bank 2 2× | Bank 1 primary SDRAM width (1–127, usually 8) | | | | | | | Width of bank 1 data SDRAM devices. Bank 2 may be same width, or 2× width if bit 7 is set. |
| 14 | 0x0e | Bank 2 2× | Bank 1 ECC SDRAM width (0–127) | | | | | | | Width of bank 1 ECC/parity SDRAM devices. Bank 2 may be same width, or 2× width if bit 7 is set. |
| 15 | 0x0f | Clock delay for random column reads | | | | | | | | Typically 1 |
| 16 | 0x10 | Page | — | — | — | 8 | 4 | 2 | 1 | Burst lengths supported (bitmap) |
| 17 | 0x11 | Banks per SDRAM device (1–255) | | | | | | | | Typically 2 or 4 |
| 18 | 0x12 | — | 7 | 6 | 5 | 4 | 3 | 2 | 1 | C̅A̅S̅ latencies supported (bitmap) |
| 19 | 0x13 | — | 6 | 5 | 4 | 3 | 2 | 1 | 0 | C̅S̅ latencies supported (bitmap) |
| 20 | 0x14 | — | 6 | 5 | 4 | 3 | 2 | 1 | 0 | W̅E̅ latencies supported (bitmap) |
| 21 | 0x15 | — | Redundant | Diff. clock | Registered data | Buffered data | On-card PLL | Registered addr. | Buffered addr. | Memory module feature bitmap |
| 22 | 0x16 | — | — | Upper V_{cc} (supply voltage) tolerance | Lower V_{cc} (supply voltage) tolerance | Write/1 read burst | Precharge all | Auto-precharge | Early R̅A̅S̅ precharge | Memory chip feature support bitmap |
| 23 | 0x17 | Nanoseconds (4–18) | | | | Tenths of nanoseconds (0–9: 0.0–0.9) | | | | Clock cycle time at medium CAS latency |
| 24 | 0x18 | Nanoseconds (4–18) | | | | Tenths of nanoseconds (0–9: 0.0–0.9) | | | | Data access time from clock (t_{AC}) |
| 25 | 0x19 | Nanoseconds (1–63) | | | | | | 0.25 ns (0–3: 0.00–0.75) | | Clock cycle time at short CAS latency. |
| 26 | 0x1a | Nanoseconds (1–63) | | | | | | 0.25 ns (0–3: 0.00–0.75) | | Data access time from clock (t_{AC}) |
| 27 | 0x1b | Nanoseconds (1–255) | | | | | | | | Minimum row precharge time (t_{RP}) |
| 28 | 0x1c | Nanoseconds (1–255) | | | | | | | | Minimum row active–row active delay (t_{RRD}) |
| 29 | 0x1d | Nanoseconds (1–255) | | | | | | | | Minimum R̅A̅S̅ to C̅A̅S̅ delay (t_{RCD}) |
| 30 | 0x1e | Nanoseconds (1–255) | | | | | | | | Minimum active to precharge time (t_{RAS}) |
| 31 | 0x1f | 512 MiB | 256 MiB | 128 MiB | 64 MiB | 32 MiB | 16 MiB | 8 MiB | 4 MiB | Module bank density (bitmap). Two bits set if different size banks. |
| 32 | 0x20 | Sign (1: −) | Nanoseconds (0–7) | | | Tenths of nanoseconds (0–9: 0.0–0.9) | | | | Address/command setup time from clock |
| 33 | 0x21 | Sign (1: −) | Nanoseconds (0–7) | | | Tenths of nanoseconds (0–9: 0.0–0.9) | | | | Address/command hold time after clock |
| 34 | 0x22 | Sign (1: −) | Nanoseconds (0–7) | | | Tenths of nanoseconds (0–9: 0.0–0.9) | | | | Data input setup time from clock |
| 35 | 0x23 | Sign (1: −) | Nanoseconds (0–7) | | | Tenths of nanoseconds (0–9: 0.0–0.9) | | | | Data input hold time after clock |
| 36–61 | 0x24–0x3d | Reserved | | | | | | | | For future standardization |
| 62 | 0x3e | Major revision (0–9) | | | | Minor revision (0–9) | | | | SPD revision level; e.g., 1.2 |
| 63 | 0x3f | Checksum | | | | | | | | Sum of bytes 0–62, not then negated |
| 64–71 | 0x40–47 | Manufacturer JEDEC id. | | | | | | | | Stored little-endian, trailing zero-padded |
| 72 | 0x48 | Module manufacturing location | | | | | | | | Vendor-specific code |
| 73–90 | 0x49–0x5a | Module part number | | | | | | | | ASCII, space-padded |
| 91–92 | 0x5b–0x5c | Module revision code | | | | | | | | Vendor-specific code |
| 93 | 0x5d | Tens of years (0–9: 0–90) | | | | Years (0–9) | | | | Manufacturing date (YYWW) |
| 94 | 0x5e | Tens of weeks (0–5: 0–50) | | | | Weeks (0–9) | | | | Manufacturing date (YYWW) |
| 95–98 | 0x5f–0x62 | Module serial number | | | | | | | | Vendor-specific code |
| 99–125 | 0x63–0x7f | Manufacturer-specific data | | | | | | | | Could be enhanced performance profile |
| 126 | 0x7e | 0x66 [sic] for 66 MHz, 0x64 for 100 MHz | | | | | | | | Intel frequency support |
| 127 | 0x7f | CLK0 | CLK1 | CLK3 | CLK3 | 90/100 °C | CL3 | CL2 | Concurrent AP | Intel feature bitmap |

=== DDR SDRAM ===
The DDR DIMM SPD format is an extension of the SDR SDRAM format. Mostly, parameter ranges are rescaled to accommodate higher speeds.

SPD contents for DDR SDRAM
| Byte | | Bit | | | | | | | | Notes |
| (dec.) | (hex.) | 7 | 6 | 5 | 4 | 3 | 2 | 1 | 0 | Notes |
|---|---|---|---|---|---|---|---|---|---|---|
| 0 | 0x00 | Number of bytes written | | | | | | | | Typically 128 |
| 1 | 0x01 | log_{2}(size of SPD EEPROM) | | | | | | | | Typically 8 (256 bytes) |
| 2 | 0x02 | Basic memory type (7 = DDR SDRAM) | | | | | | | | |
| 3 | 0x03 | Bank 2 row address bits (0–15) | | | | Bank 1 row address bits (1–15) | | | | Bank 2 is 0 if same as bank 1. |
| 4 | 0x04 | Bank 2 column address bits (0–15) | | | | Bank 1 column address bits (1–15) | | | | Bank 2 is 0 if same as bank 1. |
| 5 | 0x05 | Number of RAM banks on module (1–255) | | | | | | | | Commonly 1 or 2 |
| 6 | 0x06 | Module data width low byte | | | | | | | | Commonly 64, or 72 for ECC DIMMs |
| 7 | 0x07 | Module data width high byte | | | | | | | | 0, unless width ≥ 256 bits |
| 8 | 0x08 | Interface voltage level of this assembly (not the same as V_{cc} supply voltage) (0–5) | | | | | | | | Decoded by table lookup |
| 9 | 0x09 | Nanoseconds (0–15) | | | | Tenths of nanoseconds (0.0–0.9) | | | | Clock cycle time at highest CAS latency. |
| 10 | 0x0a | Tenths of nanoseconds (0.0–0.9) | | | | Hundredths of nanoseconds (0.00–0.09) | | | | SDRAM access time from clock (t_{AC}) |
| 11 | 0x0b | DIMM configuration type (0–2): non-ECC, parity, ECC | | | | | | | | Table lookup |
| 12 | 0x0c | Self | Refresh period (0–5): 64, 256, 128, 32, 16, 8 kHz | | | | | | | Refresh requirements |
| 13 | 0x0d | Bank 2 2× | Bank 1 primary SDRAM width (1–127) | | | | | | | Width of bank 1 data SDRAM devices. Bank 2 may be same width, or 2× width if bit 7 is set. |
| 14 | 0x0e | Bank 2 2× | Bank 1 ECC SDRAM width (0–127) | | | | | | | Width of bank 1 ECC/parity SDRAM devices. Bank 2 may be same width, or 2× width if bit 7 is set. |
| 15 | 0x0f | Clock delay for random column reads | | | | | | | | Typically 1 |
| 16 | 0x10 | Page | — | — | — | 8 | 4 | 2 | 1 | Burst lengths supported (bitmap) |
| 17 | 0x11 | Banks per SDRAM device (1–255) | | | | | | | | Typically 4 |
| 18 | 0x12 | — | 4 | 3.5 | 3 | 2.5 | 2 | 1.5 | 1 | C̅A̅S̅ latencies supported (bitmap) |
| 19 | 0x13 | — | 6 | 5 | 4 | 3 | 2 | 1 | 0 | C̅S̅ latencies supported (bitmap) |
| 20 | 0x14 | — | 6 | 5 | 4 | 3 | 2 | 1 | 0 | W̅E̅ latencies supported (bitmap) |
| 21 | 0x15 | — | x | Diff clock | FET switch external enable | FET switch on-board enable | On-card PLL | Registered | Buffered | Memory module feature bitmap |
| 22 | 0x16 | Fast AP | Concurrent auto precharge | Upper V_{cc} (supply voltage) tolerance | Lower V_{cc} (supply voltage) tolerance | — | — | — | Includes weak driver | Memory chip feature bitmap |
| 23 | 0x17 | Nanoseconds (0–15) | | | | Tenths of nanoseconds (0.0–0.9) | | | | Clock cycle time at medium CAS latency. |
| 24 | 0x18 | Tenths of nanoseconds (0.0–0.9) | | | | Hundredths of nanoseconds (0.00–0.09) | | | | Data access time from clock (t_{AC}) |
| 25 | 0x19 | Nanoseconds (0–15) | | | | Tenths of nanoseconds (0.0–0.9) | | | | Clock cycle time at short CAS latency. |
| 26 | 0x1a | Tenths of nanoseconds (0.0–0.9) | | | | Hundredths of nanoseconds (0.00–0.09) | | | | Data access time from clock (t_{AC}) |
| 27 | 0x1b | Nanoseconds (1–63) | | | | | | 0.25 ns (0–0.75) | | Minimum row precharge time (t_{RP}) |
| 28 | 0x1c | Nanoseconds (1–63) | | | | | | 0.25 ns (0–0.75) | | Minimum row active–row active delay (t_{RRD}) |
| 29 | 0x1d | Nanoseconds (1–63) | | | | | | 0.25 ns (0–0.75) | | Minimum R̅A̅S̅ to C̅A̅S̅ delay (t_{RCD}) |
| 30 | 0x1e | Nanoseconds (1–255) | | | | | | | | Minimum active to precharge time (t_{RAS}) |
| 31 | 0x1f | 512 MiB | 256 MiB | 128 MiB | 64 MiB | 32 MiB | 16 MiB/ 4 GiB | 8 MiB/ 2 GiB | 4 MiB/ 1 GiB | Module bank density (bitmap). Two bits set if different size banks. |
| 32 | 0x20 | Tenths of nanoseconds (0.0–0.9) | | | | Hundredths of nanoseconds (0.00–0.09) | | | | Address/command setup time from clock |
| 33 | 0x21 | Tenths of nanoseconds (0.0–0.9) | | | | Hundredths of nanoseconds (0.00–0.09) | | | | Address/command hold time after clock |
| 34 | 0x22 | Tenths of nanoseconds (0.0–0.9) | | | | Hundredths of nanoseconds (0.00–0.09) | | | | Data input setup time from clock |
| 35 | 0x23 | Tenths of nanoseconds (0.0–0.9) | | | | Hundredths of nanoseconds (0.00–0.09) | | | | Data input hold time after clock |
| 36–40 | 0x24–0x28 | Reserved | | | | | | | | Superset information |
| 41 | 0x29 | Nanoseconds (1–255) | | | | | | | | Minimum active to active/refresh time (t_{RC}) |
| 42 | 0x2a | Nanoseconds (1–255) | | | | | | | | Minimum refresh to active/refresh time (t_{RFC}) |
| 43 | 0x2b | Nanoseconds (1–63, or 255: no maximum) | | | | | | 0.25 ns (0–0.75) | | Maximum clock cycle time (t_{CK} max.) |
| 44 | 0x2c | Hundredths of nanoseconds (0.01–2.55) | | | | | | | | Maximum skew, DQS to any DQ. (t_{DQSQ} max.) |
| 45 | 0x2d | Tenths of nanoseconds (0.0–1.2) | | | | Hundredths of nanoseconds (0.00–0.09) | | | | Read data hold skew factor (t_{QHS}) |
| 46 | 0x2e | Reserved | | | | | | | | For future standardization |
| 47 | 0x2f | — | | | | | | Height | | Height of DIMM module, table lookup |
| 48–61 | 0x30–0x3d | Reserved | | | | | | | | For future standardization |
| 62 | 0x3e | Major revision (0–9) | | | | Minor revision (0–9) | | | | SPD revision level, 0.0 or 1.0 |
| 63 | 0x3f | Checksum | | | | | | | | Sum of bytes 0–62, not then negated |
| 64–71 | 0x40–47 | Manufacturer JEDEC id. | | | | | | | | Stored little-endian, trailing zero-padded |
| 72 | 0x48 | Module manufacturing location | | | | | | | | Vendor-specific code |
| 73–90 | 0x49–0x5a | Module part number | | | | | | | | ASCII, space-padded |
| 91–92 | 0x5b–0x5c | Module revision code | | | | | | | | Vendor-specific code |
| 93 | 0x5d | Tens of years (0–90) | | | | Years (0–9) | | | | Manufacturing date (YYWW) |
| 94 | 0x5e | Tens of weeks (0–50) | | | | Weeks (0–9) | | | | Manufacturing date (YYWW) |
| 95–98 | 0x5f–0x62 | Module serial number | | | | | | | | Vendor-specific code |
| 99–127 | 0x63–0x7f | Manufacturer-specific data | | | | | | | | Could be enhanced performance profile |

=== DDR2 SDRAM ===
The DDR2 SPD standard makes a number of changes, but is roughly similar to the above. One notable deletion is the confusing and little-used support for DIMMs with two ranks of different sizes.

For cycle time fields (bytes 9, 23, 25 and 49), which are encoded in BCD, some additional encodings are defined for the tenths digit to represent some common timings exactly:

DDR2 BCD extensions
| Hex | Binary | Significance |
|---|---|---|
| A | 1010 | 0.25 (1/4) |
| B | 1011 | 0.33 (1/3) |
| C | 1100 | 0.66 (2/3) |
| D | 1101 | 0.75 (3/4) |
| E | 1110 | 0.875 (7/8, Nvidia XMP extension) |
| F | 1111 | Reserved |

SPD contents for DDR2 SDRAM
| Byte | | Bit | | | | | | | | Notes |
| Dec | Hex | 7 | 6 | 5 | 4 | 3 | 2 | 1 | 0 | Notes |
|---|---|---|---|---|---|---|---|---|---|---|
| 0 | 0x00 | Number of bytes written | | | | | | | | Typically 128 |
| 1 | 0x01 | log_{2}(size of SPD EEPROM) | | | | | | | | Typically 8 (256 bytes) |
| 2 | 0x02 | Basic memory type (8 = DDR2 SDRAM) | | | | | | | | |
| 3 | 0x03 | Reserved | | | | Row address bits (1–15) | | | | |
| 4 | 0x04 | Reserved | | | | Column address bits (1–15) | | | | |
| 5 | 0x05 | Vertical height | | | Stack? | ConC? | Ranks−1 (1–8) | | | Commonly 0 or 1, meaning 1 or 2 |
| 6 | 0x06 | Module data width | | | | | | | | Commonly 64, or 72 for ECC DIMMs |
| 7 | 0x07 | Reserved | | | | | | | | |
| 8 | 0x08 | Interface voltage level of this assembly (not the same as V_{cc} supply voltage) (0–5) | | | | | | | | Decoded by table lookup. Commonly 5 = SSTL 1.8 V |
| 9 | 0x09 | Nanoseconds (0–15) | | | | Tenths of nanoseconds (0.0–0.9) | | | | Clock cycle time at highest CAS latency. |
| 10 | 0x0a | Tenths of nanoseconds (0.0–0.9) | | | | Hundredths of nanoseconds (0.00–0.09) | | | | SDRAM access time from clock (t_{AC}) |
| 11 | 0x0b | DIMM configuration type (0–2): non-ECC, parity, ECC | | | | | | | | Table lookup |
| 12 | 0x0c | Self | Refresh period (0–5): 64, 256, 128, 32, 16, 8 kHz | | | | | | | Refresh requirements |
| 13 | 0x0d | Primary SDRAM width (1–255) | | | | | | | | Commonly 8 (module built from ×8 parts) or 16 |
| 14 | 0x0e | ECC SDRAM width (0–255) | | | | | | | | Width of bank ECC/parity SDRAM devices. Commonly 0 or 8. |
| 15 | 0x0f | Reserved | | | | | | | | |
| 16 | 0x10 | — | — | — | — | 8 | 4 | — | — | Burst lengths supported (bitmap) |
| 17 | 0x11 | Banks per SDRAM device (1–255) | | | | | | | | Typically 4 or 8 |
| 18 | 0x12 | 7 | 6 | 5 | 4 | 3 | 2 | — | — | C̅A̅S̅ latencies supported (bitmap) |
| 19 | 0x13 | Reserved | | | | | | | | |
| 20 | 0x14 | — | — | Mini-UDIMM | Mini-RDIMM | Micro-DIMM | SO-DIMM | UDIMM | RDIMM | DIMM type of this assembly (bitmap) |
| 21 | 0x15 | — | Module is analysis probe | — | FET switch external enable | — | — | — | — | Memory module feature bitmap |
| 22 | 0x16 | — | — | — | — | — | — | — | Includes weak driver | Memory chip feature bitmap |
| 23 | 0x17 | Nanoseconds (0–15) | | | | Tenths of nanoseconds (0.0–0.9) | | | | Clock cycle time at medium CAS latency. |
| 24 | 0x18 | Tenths of nanoseconds (0.0–0.9) | | | | Hundredths of nanoseconds (0.00–0.09) | | | | Data access time from clock (t_{AC}) |
| 25 | 0x19 | Nanoseconds (0–15) | | | | Tenths of nanoseconds (0.0–0.9) | | | | Clock cycle time at short CAS latency. |
| 26 | 0x1a | Tenths of nanoseconds (0.0–0.9) | | | | Hundredths of nanoseconds (0.00–0.09) | | | | Data access time from clock (t_{AC}) |
| 27 | 0x1b | Nanoseconds (1–63) | | | | | | 1/4 ns (0–0.75) | | Minimum row precharge time (t_{RP}) |
| 28 | 0x1c | Nanoseconds (1–63) | | | | | | 1/4 ns (0–0.75) | | Minimum row active–row active delay (t_{RRD}) |
| 29 | 0x1d | Nanoseconds (1–63) | | | | | | 1/4 ns (0–0.75) | | Minimum R̅A̅S̅ to C̅A̅S̅ delay (t_{RCD}) |
| 30 | 0x1e | Nanoseconds (1–255) | | | | | | | | Minimum active to precharge time (t_{RAS}) |
| 31 | 0x1f | 512 MiB | 256 MiB | 128 MiB | 16 GiB | 8 GiB | 4 GiB | 2 GiB | 1 GiB | Size of each rank (bitmap). |
| 32 | 0x20 | Tenths of nanoseconds (0.0–1.2) | | | | Hundredths of nanoseconds (0.00–0.09) | | | | Address/command setup time from clock |
| 33 | 0x21 | Tenths of nanoseconds (0.0–1.2) | | | | Hundredths of nanoseconds (0.00–0.09) | | | | Address/command hold time after clock |
| 34 | 0x22 | Tenths of nanoseconds (0.0–0.9) | | | | Hundredths of nanoseconds (0.00–0.09) | | | | Data input setup time from strobe |
| 35 | 0x23 | Tenths of nanoseconds (0.0–0.9) | | | | Hundredths of nanoseconds (0.00–0.09) | | | | Data input hold time after strobe |
| 36 | 0x24 | Nanoseconds (1–63) | | | | | | 0.25 ns (0–0.75) | | Minimum write recovery time (t_{WR}) |
| 37 | 0x25 | Nanoseconds (1–63) | | | | | | 0.25 ns (0–0.75) | | Internal write to read command delay (t_{WTR}) |
| 38 | 0x26 | Nanoseconds (1–63) | | | | | | 0.25 ns (0–0.75) | | Internal read to precharge command delay (t_{RTP}) |
| 39 | 0x27 | Reserved | | | | | | | | Reserved for "memory analysis probe characteristics" |
| 40 | 0x28 | — | t_{RC} fractional ns (0–5): 0, 0.25, 0.33, 0.5, 0.66, 0.75 | | | t_{RFC} fractional ns (0–5): 0, 0.25, 0.33, 0.5, 0.66, 0.75 | | | t_{RFC} + 256 ns | Extension of bytes 41 and 42. |
| 41 | 0x29 | Nanoseconds (1–255) | | | | | | | | Minimum active to active/refresh time (t_{RC}) |
| 42 | 0x2a | Nanoseconds (1–255) | | | | | | | | Minimum refresh to active/refresh time (t_{RFC}) |
| 43 | 0x2b | Nanoseconds (0–15) | | | | Tenths of nanoseconds (0.0–0.9) | | | | Maximum clock cycle time (t_{CK} max) |
| 44 | 0x2c | Hundredths of nanoseconds (0.01–2.55) | | | | | | | | Maximum skew, DQS to any DQ. (t_{DQSQ} max) |
| 45 | 0x2d | Hundredths of nanoseconds (0.01–2.55) | | | | | | | | Read data hold skew factor (t_{QHS}) |
| 46 | 0x2e | Microseconds (1–255) | | | | | | | | PLL relock time |
| 47–61 | 0x2f–0x3d | Reserved | | | | | | | | For future standardization. |
| 62 | 0x3e | Major revision (0–9) | | | | Minor revision (0.0–0.9) | | | | SPD revision level, usually 1.0 |
| 63 | 0x3f | Checksum | | | | | | | | Sum of bytes 0–62, not negated |
| 64–71 | 0x40–47 | Manufacturer JEDEC ID | | | | | | | | Stored little-endian, trailing zero-pad |
| 72 | 0x48 | Module manufacturing location | | | | | | | | Vendor-specific code |
| 73–90 | 0x49–0x5a | Module part number | | | | | | | | ASCII, space-padded (limited to (,-,), A–Z, a–z, 0–9, space) |
| 91–92 | 0x5b–0x5c | Module revision code | | | | | | | | Vendor-specific code |
| 93 | 0x5d | Years since 2000 (0–255) | | | | | | | | Manufacturing date (YYWW) |
| 94 | 0x5e | Weeks (1–52) | | | | | | | | Manufacturing date (YYWW) |
| 95–98 | 0x5f–0x62 | Module serial number | | | | | | | | Vendor-specific code |
| 99–127 | 0x63–0x7f | Manufacturer-specific data | | | | | | | | Could be enhanced performance profile |

=== DDR3 SDRAM ===
The DDR3 SDRAM standard significantly overhauls and simplifies the SPD contents layout. Instead of a number of BCD-encoded nanosecond fields, some "timebase" units are specified to high precision, and various timing parameters are encoded as multiples of that base unit. Further, the practice of specifying different time values depending on the CAS latency has been dropped; now there are just a single set of timing parameters.

Revision 1.1 lets some parameters be expressed as a "medium time base" value plus a (signed, −128 +127) "fine time base" correction. Generally, the medium time base is 1/8 ns (125 ps), and the fine time base is 1, 2.5 or 5 ps. For compatibility with earlier versions that lack the correction, the medium time base number is usually rounded up and the correction is negative. Values that work this way are:

DDR3 SPD two-part timing parameters
| MTB byte | FTB byte | Value |
|---|---|---|
| 12 | 34 | t_{CK}min, minimum clock period |
| 16 | 35 | t_{AA}min, minimum CAS latency time |
| 18 | 36 | t_{RCD}min, minimum RAS# to CAS# delay |
| 20 | 37 | t_{RP}min, minimum row precharge delay |
| 21, 23 | 38 | t_{RC}min, minimum active to active/precharge delay |

SPD contents for DDR3 SDRAM
| Byte | | Bit | | | | | | | | Notes |
| Dec | Hex | 7 | 6 | 5 | 4 | 3 | 2 | 1 | 0 | Notes |
|---|---|---|---|---|---|---|---|---|---|---|
| 0 | 0x00 | Exclude serial from CRC | SPD bytes total (undef/256) | | | SPD bytes used (undef/128/176/256) | | | | |
| 1 | 0x01 | SPD major revision | | | | SPD minor revision | | | | 1.0, 1.1, 1.2 or 1.3 |
| 2 | 0x02 | Basic memory type (11 = DDR3 SDRAM) | | | | | | | | Type of RAM chips |
| 3 | 0x03 | Reserved | | | | Module type | | | | Type of module; e.g., 2 = Unbuffered DIMM, 3 = SO-DIMM, 11=LRDIMM |
| 4 | 0x04 | —N/a | Bank address bits−3 | | | log_{2}(bits per chip)−28 | | | | Zero means 8 banks, 256 Mibit. |
| 5 | 0x05 | —N/a | | Row address bits−12 | | | Column address bits−9 | | | |
| 6 | 0x06 | Reserved | | | | | 1.25 V | 1.35 V | Not 1.5 V | Modules voltages supported. 1.5 V is default. |
| 7 | 0x07 | —N/a | | ranks−1 | | | log_{2}(I/O bits/chip)−2 | | | Module organization |
| 8 | 0x08 | —N/a | | | ECC bits (001=8) | | log_{2}(data bits)−3 | | | 0x03 for 64-bit, non-ECC DIMM. |
| 9 | 0x09 | Dividend, picoseconds (1–15) | | | | Divisor, picoseconds (1–15) | | | | Fine Time Base, dividend/divisor |
| 10 | 0x0a | Dividend, nanoseconds (1–255) | | | | | | | | Medium Time Base, dividend/divisor; commonly 1/8 |
| 11 | 0x0b | Divisor, nanoseconds (1–255) | | | | | | | | Medium Time Base, dividend/divisor; commonly 1/8 |
| 12 | 0x0c | Minimum cycle time t_{CK}min | | | | | | | | In multiples of MTB |
| 13 | 0x0d | Reserved | | | | | | | | |
| 14 | 0x0e | 11 | 10 | 9 | 8 | 7 | 6 | 5 | 4 | CAS latencies supported (bitmap) |
| 15 | 0x0f | —N/a | 18 | 17 | 16 | 15 | 14 | 13 | 12 | CAS latencies supported (bitmap) |
| 16 | 0x10 | Minimum CAS latency time, t_{AA}min | | | | | | | | In multiples of MTB; e.g., 80/8 ns. |
| 17 | 0x11 | Minimum write recovery time, t_{WR}min | | | | | | | | In multiples of MTB; e.g., 120/8 ns. |
| 18 | 0x12 | Minimum RAS to CAS delay time, t_{RCD}min | | | | | | | | In multiples of MTB; e.g., 100/8 ns. |
| 19 | 0x13 | Minimum row to row active delay time, t_{RRD}min | | | | | | | | In multiples of MTB; e.g., 60/8 ns. |
| 20 | 0x14 | Minimum row precharge time, t_{RP}min | | | | | | | | In multiples of MTB; e.g., 100/8 ns. |
| 21 | 0x15 | t_{RC}min, bits 11:8 | | | | t_{RAS}min, bits 11:8 | | | | Upper 4 bits of bytes 23 and 22 |
| 22 | 0x16 | Minimum active to time, t_{RAS}min, bits 7:0 | | | | | | | | In multiples of MTB; e.g., 280/8 ns. |
| 23 | 0x17 | Minimum active to active/refresh, t_{RC}min, bits 7:0 | | | | | | | | In multiples of MTB; e.g., 396/8 ns. |
| 24 | 0x18 | Minimum refresh recovery delay, t_{RFC}min, bits 7:0 | | | | | | | | In multiples of MTB; e.g., 1280/8 ns. |
| 25 | 0x19 | Minimum refresh recovery delay, t_{RFC}min, bits 15:8 | | | | | | | | In multiples of MTB; e.g., 1280/8 ns. |
| 26 | 0x1a | Minimum internal write to read delay, t_{WTR}min | | | | | | | | In multiples of MTB; e.g., 60/8 ns. |
| 27 | 0x1b | Minimum internal read to precharge delay, t_{RTP}min | | | | | | | | In multiples of MTB; e.g., 60/8 ns. |
| 28 | 0x1c | Reserved | | | | t_{FAW}min, bits 11:8 | | | | In multiples of MTB; e.g., 240/8 ns. |
| 29 | 0x1d | Minimum four activate window delay t_{FAW}min, bits 7:0 | | | | | | | | In multiples of MTB; e.g., 240/8 ns. |
| 30 | 0x1e | DLL-off | —N/a | | | | | RZQ/7 | RZQ/6 | SDRAM optional features support bitmap |
| 31 | 0x1f | PASR | —N/a | | | ODTS | ASR | ETR 1× | ETR (95 °C) | SDRAM thermal and refresh options |
| 32 | 0x20 | Present | Accuracy (TBD; currently 0 = undefined) | | | | | | | DIMM thermal sensor present? |
| 33 | 0x21 | Nonstd. | Die count | | | —N/a | | Signal load | | Nonstandard SDRAM device type (e.g., stacked die) |
| 34 | 0x22 | t_{CK}min correction (new for 1.1) | | | | | | | | Signed multiple of FTB, added to byte 12 |
| 35 | 0x23 | t_{AA}min correction (new for 1.1) | | | | | | | | Signed multiple of FTB, added to byte 16 |
| 36 | 0x24 | t_{RCD}min correction (new for 1.1) | | | | | | | | Signed multiple of FTB, added to byte 18 |
| 37 | 0x25 | t_{RP}min correction (new for 1.1) | | | | | | | | Signed multiple of FTB, added to byte 20 |
| 38 | 0x26 | t_{RC}min correction (new for 1.1) | | | | | | | | Signed multiple of FTB, added to byte 23 |
| 39–40 | 0x27–0x28 | Reserved | | | | | | | | For future standardization. |
| 41 | 0x29 | Vendor specific | | t_{MAW} | | Maximum Activate Count (MAC) (untested/700k/600k/.../200k/reserved/∞) | | | | For row hammer mitigation |
| 42–59 | 0x2a–0x3b | Reserved | | | | | | | | For future standardization. |
| 60 | 0x3c | —N/a | | | Module height, mm (1–31, >45) | | | | | Module nominal height |
| 61 | 0x3d | Back thickness, mm (1–16) | | | | Front thickness, mm (1–16) | | | | Module thickness, value = ceil(mm) − 1 |
| 62 | 0x3e | Design | Revision | | JEDEC design number | | | | | JEDEC reference design used (11111=none) |
| 63–116 | 0x3f–0x74 | Module-specific section | | | | | | | | Differs between registered/unbuffered |
| 117 | 0x75 | Module manufacturer ID, lsbyte | | | | | | | | Assigned by JEP-106 |
| 118 | 0x76 | Module manufacturer ID, msbyte | | | | | | | | Assigned by JEP-106 |
| 119 | 0x77 | Module manufacturing location | | | | | | | | Vendor-specific code |
| 120 | 0x78 | Tens of years | | | | Years | | | | Manufacturing year (BCD) |
| 121 | 0x79 | Tens of weeks | | | | Weeks | | | | Manufacturing week (BCD) |
| 122–125 | 0x7a–0x7d | Module serial number | | | | | | | | Vendor-specific code |
| 126–127 | 0x7e–0x7f | SPD CRC-16 | | | | | | | | Includes bytes 0–116 or 0–125; see byte 0 bit 7 |
| 128–145 | 0x80–0x91 | Module part number | | | | | | | | ASCII subset, space-padded |
| 146–147 | 0x92–0x93 | Module revision code | | | | | | | | Vendor-defined |
| 148–149 | 0x94–0x95 | DRAM manufacturer ID | | | | | | | | As distinct from module manufacturer |
| 150–175 | 0x96–0xAF | Manufacturer-specific data | | | | | | | | |
| 176–255 | 0xB0–0xFF | Available for customer use | | | | | | | | |

The memory capacity of a module can be computed from bytes 4, 7 and 8. The module width (byte 8) divided by the number of bits per chip (byte 7) gives the number of chips per rank. That can then be multiplied by the per-chip capacity (byte 4) and the number of ranks of chips on the module (usually 1 or 2, from byte 7).

=== DDR4 SDRAM ===
The DDR4 SDRAM "Annex L" standard for SPD changes the EEPROM module used. Instead of the old AT24C02-compatible 256-byte EEPROMs, JEDEC now defines a new nonstandard EE1004 type with two pages at the SMBus level each with 256 bytes. The new memory still uses the old 0x50–0x57 addresses, but two additional address at 0x36 (SPA0) and 0x37 (SPA1) are now used to receive commands to select the currently-active page for the bus, a form of bank switching. Internally each logical page is further divided into two physical blocks of 128 bytes each, totaling four blocks and 512 bytes. Other semantics for "special" address ranges remain the same, although write protection is now addressed by blocks and a high voltage at SA0 is now required to change its status.

Annex L defines a few different layouts that can be plugged into a 512-byte (of which a maximum of 320 bytes are defined) template, depending on the type of the memory module. The bit definitions are similar to DDR3.

SPD contents for DDR4 SDRAM
| Byte | | Bit | | | | | | | | Notes |
| Dec | Hex | 7 | 6 | 5 | 4 | 3 | 2 | 1 | 0 | Notes |
|---|---|---|---|---|---|---|---|---|---|---|
| 0 | 0x00 | SPD bytes used | | | | | | | | |
| 1 | 0x01 | SPD revision n | | | | | | | | Typically 0x10, 0x11, 0x12 |
| 2 | 0x02 | Basic memory type (12 = DDR4 SDRAM) | | | | | | | | Type of RAM chips |
| 3 | 0x03 | Reserved | | | | Module type | | | | Type of module; e.g., 2 = Unbuffered DIMM, 3 = SO-DIMM, 11=LRDIMM |
| 4 | 0x04 | Bank group bits | | Bank address bits−2 | | Total SDRAM capacity per die in megabits | | | | Zero means no bank groups, 4 banks, 256 Mibit. |
| 5 | 0x05 | Reserved | | Row address bits−12 | | | Column address bits−9 | | | |
| 6 | 0x06 | Primary SDRAM package type | Die count | | | Reserved | | Signal loading | | |
| 7 | 0x07 | Reserved | | Maximum activate window (tMAW) | | Maximum activate count (MAC) | | | | SDRAM optional features |
| 8 | 0x08 | Reserved | | | | | | | | SDRAM thermal and refresh options |
| 9 | 0x09 | Post package repair (PPR) | | Soft PPR | Reserved | | | | | Other SDRAM optional features |
| 10 | 0x0a | SDRAM package type | Die count−1 | | | DRAM density ratio | | Signal loading | | Secondary SDRAM package type |
| 11 | 0x0b | Reserved | | | | | | Endurant flag | Operable flag | Module nominal voltage, VDD |
| 12 | 0x0c | Reserved | Rank mix | Package ranks per DIMM−1 | | | SDRAM device width | | | Module organization |
| 13 | 0x0d | Reserved | | | Bus width extension | | Primary bus width | | | Module memory bus width in bits |
| 14 | 0x0e | Thermal sensor | Reserved | | | | | | | Module thermal sensor |
| 15 | 0x0f | Reserved | | | | Extended base module type | | | | |
| 16 | 0x10 | Reserved | | | | | | | | |
| 17 | 0x11 | Reserved | | | | Medium timebase (MTB) | | Fine timebase (FTB) | | Measured in ps. |
| 18 | 0x12 | Minimum SDRAM cycle time, t_{CKAVG}min | | | | | | | | In multiples of MTB; e.g., 100/8 ns. |
| 19 | 0x13 | Maximum SDRAM cycle time, t_{CKAVG}max | | | | | | | | In multiples of MTB; e.g., 60/8 ns. |
| 20 | 0x14 | 14 | 13 | 12 | 11 | 10 | 9 | 8 | 7 | CAS latencies supported bit-mask |
| 21 | 0x15 | 22 | 21 | 20 | 19 | 18 | 17 | 16 | 15 | CAS latencies supported bit-mask |
| 22 | 0x16 | 30 | 29 | 28 | 27 | 26 | 25 | 24 | 23 | CAS latencies supported bit-mask |
| 23 | 0x17 | Low CL range | Reserved | 36 | 35 | 34 | 33 | 32 | 31 | CAS latencies supported bit-mask |
| 24 | 0x18 | Minimum CAS latency time, t_{AA}min | | | | | | | | In multiples of MTB; e.g., 1280/8 ns. |
| 25 | 0x19 | Minimum RAS to CAS delay time, t_{RCD}min | | | | | | | | In multiples of MTB; e.g., 60/8 ns. |
| 26 | 0x1a | Minimum row precharge delay time, t_{RP}min | | | | | | | | In multiples of MTB; e.g., 60/8 ns. |
| 27 | 0x1b | Upper nibbles for t_{RAS}min and t_{RC}min | | | | | | | | |
| 28 | 0x1c | Minimum active to precharge delay time, t_{RAS}min least significant byte | | | | | | | | In multiples of MTB |
| 29 | 0x1d | Minimum active to active/refresh delay time, t_{RC}min least significant byte | | | | | | | | In multiples of MTB |
| 30 | 0x1e | Minimum refresh recovery delay time, t_{RFC1}min least significant byte | | | | | | | | In multiples of MTB |
| 31 | 0x1f | Minimum refresh recovery delay time, t_{RFC1}min most significant byte | | | | | | | | In multiples of MTB |
| 32 | 0x20 | Minimum refresh recovery delay time, t_{RFC2}min least significant byte | | | | | | | | In multiples of MTB |
| 33 | 0x21 | Minimum refresh recovery delay time, t_{RFC2}min most significant byte | | | | | | | | In multiples of MTB |
| 34 | 0x22 | Minimum refresh recovery delay time, t_{RFC4}min least significant byte | | | | | | | | In multiples of MTB |
| 35 | 0x23 | Minimum refresh recovery delay time, t_{RFC4}min most significant byte | | | | | | | | In multiples of MTB |
| 36 | 0x24 | Reserved | | | | t_{FAW}min most significant nibble | | | | |
| 37 | 0x25 | Minimum four activate window delay time, t_{FAW}min least significant byte | | | | | | | | In multiples of MTB |
| 38 | 0x26 | Minimum activate to activate delay time, t_{RRD_S}min, different bank group | | | | | | | | In multiples of MTB |
| 39 | 0x27 | Minimum activate to activate delay time, t_{RRD_L}min, same bank group | | | | | | | | In multiples of MTB |
| 40 | 0x28 | Minimum CAS to CAS delay time, t_{CCD_L}min, same bank group | | | | | | | | In multiples of MTB |
| 41 | 0x29 | Upper nibble for t_{WR}min | | | | | | | | |
| 42 | 0x2a | Minimum write recovery time, t_{WR}min | | | | | | | | In multiples of MTB |
| 43 | 0x2b | Upper nibbles for t_{WTR}min | | | | | | | | |
| 44 | 0x2c | Minimum write to read time, t_{WTR_S}min, different bank group | | | | | | | | In multiples of MTB |
| 45 | 0x2d | Minimum write to read time, t_{WTR_L}min, same bank group | | | | | | | | In multiples of MTB |
| 49–59 | 0x2e–0x3b | Reserved | | | | | | | | Base configuration section |
| 60–77 | 0x3c–0x4d | Connector to SDRAM bit mapping | | | | | | | | |
| 78–116 | 0x4e–0x74 | Reserved | | | | | | | | Base configuration section |
| 117 | 0x75 | Fine offset for minimum CAS to CAS delay time, t_{CCD_L}min, same bank | | | | | | | | Two's complement multiplier for FTB units |
| 118 | 0x76 | Fine offset for minimum activate to activate delay time, t_{RRD_L}min, same bank group | | | | | | | | Two's complement multiplier for FTB units |
| 119 | 0x77 | Fine offset for minimum activate to activate delay time, t_{RRD_S}min, different bank group | | | | | | | | Two's complement multiplier for FTB units |
| 120 | 0x78 | Fine offset for minimum active to active/refresh delay time, t_{RC}min | | | | | | | | Two's complement multiplier for FTB units |
| 121 | 0x79 | Fine offset for minimum row precharge delay time, t_{RP}min | | | | | | | | Two's complement multiplier for FTB units |
| 122 | 0x7a | Fine offset for minimum RAS to CAS delay time, t_{RCD}min | | | | | | | | Two's complement multiplier for FTB units |
| 123 | 0x7b | Fine offset for minimum CAS latency time, t_{AA}min | | | | | | | | Two's complement multiplier for FTB units |
| 124 | 0x7c | Fine offset for SDRAM maximum cycle time, t_{CKAVG}max | | | | | | | | Two's complement multiplier for FTB units |
| 125 | 0x7d | Fine offset for SDRAM minimum cycle time, t_{CKAVG}min | | | | | | | | Two's complement multiplier for FTB units |
| 126 | 0x7e | Cyclic rendundancy code (CRC) for base config section, least significant byte | | | | | | | | CRC16 algorithm |
| 127 | 0x7f | Cyclic rendundancy code (CRC) for base config section, most significant byte | | | | | | | | CRC16 algorithm |
| 128–191 | 0x80–0xbf | Module-specific section | | | | | | | | Dependent upon memory module family (UDIMM, RDIMM, LRDIMM) |
| 192–255 | 0xc0–0xff | Hybrid memory architecture specific parameters | | | | | | | | |
| 256–319 | 0x100–0x13f | Extended function parameter block | | | | | | | | |
| 320–321 | 0x140–0x141 | Module manufacturer | | | | | | | | See JEP-106 |
| 322 | 0x142 | Module manufacturing location | | | | | | | | Manufacturer-defined manufacturing location code |
| 323 | 0x143 | Module manufacturing year | | | | | | | | Represented in Binary Coded Decimal (BCD) |
| 324 | 0x144 | Module manufacturing week | | | | | | | | Represented in Binary Coded Decimal (BCD) |
| 325–328 | 0x145–0x148 | Module serial number | | | | | | | | Manufacturer-defined format for a unique serial number across part numbers |
| 329–348 | 0x149–0x15c | Module part number | | | | | | | | ASCII part number, unused digits should be set to 0x20 |
| 349 | 0x15d | Module revision code | | | | | | | | Manufacturer-defined revision code |
| 350–351 | 0x15e–0x15f | DRAM manufacturer ID code | | | | | | | | See JEP-106 |
| 352 | 0x160 | DRAM stepping | | | | | | | | Manufacturer-defined stepping or 0xFF if not used |
| 353–381 | 0x161–0x17d | Manufacturer's specific data | | | | | | | | |
| 382–383 | 0x17e–0x17f | Reserved | | | | | | | | |

=== DDR5 SDRAM ===
Preliminary table for DDR5, based on JESD400-5 specification.

DDR5 expands the SPD table to 1024-byte. SPD of DDR5 is using the I3C bus.

SPD contents for DDR5 SDRAM
| Byte | | Bit | | | | | | | | Notes |
| Dec | Hex | 7 | 6 | 5 | 4 | 3 | 2 | 1 | 0 | Notes |
|---|---|---|---|---|---|---|---|---|---|---|
| 0 | 0x00 | Number of bytes in SPD device | | | | | | | | |
| 1 | 0x01 | SPD revision for base configuration parameters | | | | | | | | |
| 2 | 0x02 | Key byte / host bus command protocol type | | | | | | | | |
| 3 | 0x03 | Key byte / module type | | | | | | | | |
| 4 | 0x04 | First SDRAM density and package | | | | | | | | |
| 5 | 0x05 | First SDRAM addressing | | | | | | | | |
| 6 | 0x06 | First SDRAM I/O width | | | | | | | | |
| 7 | 0x07 | First SDRAM bank groups & banks per bank group | | | | | | | | |
| 8 | 0x08 | Second SDRAM density and package | | | | | | | | |
| 9 | 0x09 | Second SDRAM addressing | | | | | | | | |
| 10 | 0x0a | Second SDRAM I/O width | | | | | | | | |
| 11 | 0x0b | Second SDRAM bank groups & banks per bank group | | | | | | | | |
| 12 | 0x0c | SDRAM optional features | | | | | | | | |
| 13 | 0x0d | Thermal and refresh options | | | | | | | | |
| 14 | 0x0e | Reserved | | | | | | | | |
| 15 | 0x0f | Reserved | | | | | | | | |
| 16 | 0x10 | SDRAM nominal voltage, VDD | | | | | | | | |

== EEPROM chip ==
There are three main generations of EEPROMs as described in JEDEC standards: the 256-byte EE1002 for DDR3 and earlier, the 512-byte EE1004 for DDR4, and the 1024-byte "hub" SPD5118 for DDR5. The EE1002 is the standard 24-series EEPROM. The EE1004 is the newer 34-series EEPROM and differs mainly in having a "page switch" command to allow access to its full content (among other differences). The SPD5118 is very different.

There are also thermal sensor versions of EE1002 and EE1004 but they speak the same protocol for their SPD part.

=== Addressing ===
As mentioned above SPD uses three pins for addressing up to 8 separate modules from 0 to 7. This is only correct for EE1002 and EE1004; SPD5118 uses a single pin with grounding resistors to specify the module's identity from 0 to 7.

For EE1002 and EE1004 the I^{2}C address range is 0x50–0x57. They also use respond to 0x30–0x37 if they have not been write protected (see below). If they have an associated thermal sensor, they use 0x18–0x1F. All those values are seven-bit I^{2}C addresses formed by a Device Type Identifier Code prefix (DTIC) with SA0-2: to read (1100) from slot 3, one uses 110 0011 = 0x33. With a final R/W bit it forms the 8-bit Device Select Code.

The 5118 contains many devices. The hub itself lies at 0x50–0x57, as before. The local devices are addressed through the hub using I^{3}C.

=== Write protection ===
The EE1002 has three layers of write protection. The hardware layer is in the form of a WC# pin; when driven low, it prevents all writes. The software layer is in the form of a few commands. Changing software write protect requires driving V_{HV} (instead of the regular 0 or 1 logic voltages) on the address pin SA0 with specific combinations for the other SA pins. As a result there is no differentaion of slot-id. The final layer is the "permanent" layer, a command that can be sent to render the first 128 bytes permanently unchangable.

The EE1004 has no WC# pin or a "permanent" layer. It has four commands to separately set the write-protect status of each 64-byte slice of the device (using different ) and one to clear them all at once. These commands all require driving V_{HV} like before.

The SPD5118 has two modes of protection. In the normal operating mode with the address pin connected to GND via a resistor, protection can only be added to 64-byte slices, not removed. In the "tester" mode with the address pin connected to GND directly however, these bits can be freely removed. (The hub itself also has a number of volatile and non-volatile registers independent of the EEPROM part. Some registers are "password-protected", being neither readable nor writable unless the correct value is filled to the "password registers".)

On many newer computers with DDR4 or DDR5 DIMM, the UEFI/BIOS will mark SPD EEPROM as read-only if the boot-time memory initialization is completed. This makes software like Thaiphoon Burner difficult to modify SPD EEPROM.

== Extensions ==
The JEDEC standard only specifies some of the SPD bytes. The truly critical data (for up to DDR3) fits into the first 64 bytes, while some of the remainder is earmarked for manufacturer identification. However, a 256-byte EEPROM is standardized (for up to DDR3). A number of uses have been made of the remaining space.

Memory generally comes with conservative timing recommendations in the SPD ROM, to ensure basic functionality on all systems. Enthusiasts often spend considerable time manually adjusting the memory timings for higher speed. Enabling special configurations such as Intel XMP or AMD EXPO often requires additional testing to ensure system stability and may void CPU warranty if used out of the manufacturer’s published specifications.

=== Enhanced Performance Profiles (EPP) ===
Enhanced Performance Profiles is an extension of SPD, developed by Nvidia and Corsair, which includes additional information for higher-performance operation of DDR2 SDRAM, including supply voltages and command timing information not included in the JEDEC SPD spec. The EPP information is stored in the same EEPROM, but in bytes 99–127, which are unused by standard DDR2 SPD.

EPP SPD ROM usage
| Bytes | Size | Full profiles | Abbreviated profiles |
|---|---|---|---|
| 99–103 | 5 | EPP header | |
| 104–109 | 6 | Profile FP1 | Profile AP1 |
| 110–115 | 6 | Profile FP1 | Profile AP2 |
| 116–121 | 6 | Profile FP2 | Profile AP3 |
| 122–127 | 6 | Profile FP2 | Profile AP4 |

The parameters are particularly designed to fit the memory controller on the nForce 5, nForce 6 and nForce 7 chipsets. Nvidia encourages support for EPP in the BIOS for its high-end motherboard chipsets. This is intended to provide "one-click overclocking" to get better performance with minimal effort.

Nvidia's name for EPP memory that has been qualified for performance and stability is "SLI-ready memory". The term "SLI-ready-memory" has caused some confusion, as it has nothing to do with SLI video. One can use EPP/SLI memory with a single video card (even a non-Nvidia card), and one can run a multi-card SLI video setup without EPP/SLI memory.

An extended version, EPP 2.0, supports DDR3 memory as well.

=== Intel Extreme Memory Profile (XMP) ===
A similar, Intel-developed JEDEC SPD extension was developed for DDR3 SDRAM DIMMs, later used in DDR4 and DDR5 SDRAM as well. XMP uses bytes 176–255, which are unallocated by JEDEC, to encode higher-performance memory timings.

Later, AMD developed AMP, an equivalent technology to XMP, for use in its "Radeon Memory" line of memory modules optimized for use in AMD platforms. Furthermore, motherboard developers implemented their own technologies to allow their AMD-based motherboards to read XMP profiles: MSI offers A-XMP, ASUS has DOCP (Direct Over Clock Profile), and Gigabyte has EOCP (Extended Over Clock Profile).

==== DDR3 XMP ====
XMP SPD ROM usage
| DDR3 Bytes | Size | Use |
|---|---|---|
| 176–184 | 9 | XMP header |
| 185–219 | 35 | XMP profile 1 ("enthusiast" settings) |
| 220–254 | 35 | XMP profile 2 ("extreme" settings) |

The header contains the following data. Most importantly, it contains a "medium timebase" value MTB, as a rational number of nanoseconds (common values are 1/8, 1/12 and 1/16 ns). Many other later timing values are expressed as an integer number of MTB units.

Also included in the header is the number of DIMMs per memory channel that the profile is designed to support; including more DIMMs may not work well.

XMP Header bytes
| DDR3 Byte | Bits | Use |
|---|---|---|
| 176 | 7:0 | XMP magic number byte 1 0x0C |
| 177 | 7:0 | XMP magic number byte 2 0x4A |
| 178 | 0 | Profile 1 enabled (if 0, disabled) |
| 178 | 1 | Profile 2 enabled |
| 178 | 3:2 | Profile 1 DIMMs per channel (1–4 encoded as 0–3) |
| 178 | 5:4 | Profile 2 DIMMs per channel |
| 178 | 7:6 | Reserved |
| 179 | 3:0 | XMP minor version number (x.0 or x.1) |
| 179 | 7:4 | XMP major version number (0.x or 1.x) |
| 180 | 7:0 | Medium timebase dividend for profile 1 |
| 181 | 7:0 | Medium timebase divisor for profile 1 (MTB = dividend/divisor ns) |
| 182 | 7:0 | Medium timebase dividend for profile 2 (e.g. 8) |
| 183 | 7:0 | Medium timebase divisor for profile 2 (e.g. 1, giving MTB = 1/8 ns) |
| 184 | 7:0 | Reserved |

XMP profile bytes
| DDR3 Byte 1 | DDR3 Byte 2 | Bits | Use |
|---|---|---|---|
| 185 | 220 | 0 | Module Vdd voltage twentieths (0.00 or 0.05) |
| 185 | 220 | 4:1 | Module Vdd voltage tenths (0.0–0.9) |
| 185 | 220 | 6:5 | Module Vdd voltage units (0–2) |
| 185 | 220 | 7 | Reserved |
| 186 | 221 | 7:0 | Minimum SDRAM clock period t_{CK}min (MTB units) |
| 187 | 222 | 7:0 | Minimum CAS latency time t_{AA}min (MTB units) |
| 188 | 223 | 7:0 | CAS latencies supported (bitmap, 4–11 encoded as bits 0–7) |
| 189 | 224 | 6:0 | CAS latencies supported (bitmap, 12–18 encoded as bits 0–6) |
| 189 | 224 | 7 | Reserved |
| 190 | 225 | 7:0 | Minimum CAS write latency time t_{CWL}min (MTB units) |
| 191 | 226 | 7:0 | Minimum row precharge delay time t_{RP}min (MTB units) |
| 192 | 227 | 7:0 | Minimum RAS to CAS delay time t_{RCD}min (MTB units) |
| 193 | 228 | 7:0 | Minimum write recovery time t_{WR}min (MTB units) |
| 194 | 229 | 3:0 | t_{RAS}min upper nibble (bits 11:8) |
| 194 | 229 | 7:4 | t_{RC}min upper nibble (bits 11:8) |
| 195 | 230 | 7:0 | Minimum active to precharge delay time t_{RAS}min bits 7:0 (MTB units) |
| 196 | 231 | 7:0 | Minimum active to active/refresh delay time t_{RC}min bits 7:0 (MTB units) |
| 197 | 232 | 7:0 | Maximum average refresh interval t_{REFI} lsbyte (MTB units) |
| 198 | 233 | 7:0 | Maximum average refresh interval t_{REFI} msbyte (MTB units) |
| 199 | 234 | 7:0 | Minimum refresh recovery delay time t_{RFC}min lsbyte (MTB units) |
| 200 | 235 | 7:0 | Minimum refresh recovery delay time t_{RFC}min msbyte (MTB units) |
| 201 | 236 | 7:0 | Minimum internal read to precharge command delay time t_{RTP}min (MTB units) |
| 202 | 237 | 7:0 | Minimum row active to row active delay time t_{RRD}min (MTB units) |
| 203 | 238 | 3:0 | t_{FAW}min upper nibble (bits 11:8) |
| 203 | 238 | 7:4 | Reserved |
| 204 | 239 | 7:0 | Minimum four activate window delay time t_{FAW}min bits 7:0 (MTB units) |
| 205 | 240 | 7:0 | Minimum internal write to read command delay time t_{WTR}min (MTB units) |
| 206 | 241 | 2:0 | Write to read command turnaround time adjustment (0–7 clock cycles) |
| 206 | 241 | 3 | Write to read command turnaround adjustment sign (0=pull-in, 1=push-out) |
| 206 | 241 | 6:4 | Read to write command turnaround time adjustment (0–7 clock cycles) |
| 206 | 241 | 7 | Read to write command turnaround adjustment sign (0=pull-in, 1=push-out) |
| 207 | 242 | 2:0 | Back-to-back command turnaround time adjustment (0–7 clock cycles) |
| 207 | 242 | 3 | Back-to-back turnaround adjustment sign (0=pull-in, 1=push-out) |
| 207 | 242 | 7:4 | Reserved |
| 208 | 243 | 7:0 | System CMD rate mode. 0=JTAG default, otherwise in peculiar units of MTB × t_{CK}/ns. E.g. if MTB is 1/8 ns, then this is in units of 1/8 clock cycle. |
| 209 | 244 | 7:0 | SDRAM auto self refresh performance. Standard version 1.1 says documentation is TBD. |
| 210–218 | 245–253 | 7:0 | Reserved |
| 219 | 254 | 7:0 | Reserved, vendor-specific personality code. |

=== AMD Extended Profiles for Overclocking (EXPO) ===
AMD's Extended Profiles for Overclocking (EXPO) is a JEDEC SPD extension developed for DDR5 DIMMs to apply a one-click automatic overclocking profile to system memory. AMD EXPO-certified DIMMs include optimised timings certified to work on Zen 4 processors. Unlike Intel's closed standard XMP, the EXPO standard is open and royalty-free. It can be used on Intel platforms. At launch in September 2022, there were 15 partner RAM kits with EXPO-certification available reaching up to 6400 MT/s.

==== EXPO Ultra Low Latency (ULL) ====
At Computex 2026, AMD announced EXPO Ultra Low Latency (EXPO ULL), an enhancement to EXPO to allow specifying additional sub-timings, including t_{REFI} (refresh interval), t_{RRD_S} (RAS to RAS delay, short), and t_{WR} (write recovery time), and to also allow specifying V_{DDP} voltage. EXPO ULL will be compatible with existing EXPO-compatible motherboards, though a BIOS update will likely be necessary. For DDR5-6000, AMD claimed a 4% increase in both average fps and 1%-low fps across 30 games that it tested on a Ryzen 7 9700X CPU, versus non-ULL EXPO DIMMs. AMD claimed that EXPO ULL RAM kits would be at "effectively the same price points" as non-ULL EXPO kits. In contrast, G.Skill expected higher prices, citing a need for stricter binning.

=== Vendor-specific memory ===
A common misuse is to write information to certain memory regions to bind vendor-specific memory modules to a specific system. Fujitsu Technology Solutions is known to do this. Adding different memory module to the system usually results in a refusal or other counter-measures (like pressing F1 on every boot).

02 0E 00 01-00 00 00 EF-02 03 19 4D-BC 47 C3 46 ...........M.G.F
53 43 00 04-EF 4F 8D 1F-00 01 70 00-01 03 C1 CF SC...O....p.....

This is the output of a 512 MB memory module from Micron Technologies, branded for Fujitsu-Siemens Computers, note the "FSC" (46 53 43) string. The system BIOS rejects memory modules that don't have this information starting at offset 128h.

Some Packard Bell AMD laptops also use this method, in this case the symptoms can vary but it can lead to a flashing cursor rather than a beep pattern. Incidentally this can also be a symptom of BIOS corruption as well. Though upgrading a 2 GB to a 4 GB can also lead to issues.

== Reading and writing SPD information ==
Memory module manufacturers write the SPD information to the EEPROM on the module. Motherboard BIOSes read the SPD information to configure the memory controller.

=== Onboard SMBus ===
The motherboard SMBus controller is the "raw" way of accessing SPD on a memory module attached to it. Some motherboard chipsets allow selecting whether the SPD should be write protected. To allow access this way, the operating system must include SMBus support, have appropriate drivers for the EEPROMs, and the motherboard SMBus needs to be connected to the SPD EEPROMs.

- (R) On Linux and FreeBSD, the userspace program decode-dimms provided by i2c-tools decodes and prints JEDEC standard information on any memory with SPD information in the computer. For pre-DDR4 SPD it requires either the "eeprom" or the "at24" driver (24-series EEPROM). For DDR4 SPD it requires either the "eeprom" driver or the "ee1004" driver (34-series EEPROMs defined in JEDEC EE1004). On older Linux distributions, decode-dimms.pl was available as part of lm_sensors.
  - (W) The eeprog tool from i2c-tools allows writing to 24-series EEPROMs, i.e. up to DDR3.
- (RW) On Linux and FreeBSD, the Python script spd-eeprom reads and writes AT24 and EE1004-series EEPROMs. It only provides raw SMBus reading and writing, not decoding. Driver requirements are the same as i2c-tools.
- (R) On OpenBSD 4.3+ and NetBSD 5.0+, the spdmem(4) driver accesses the EEPROM through the SMBus to provide information about memory modules (only the JEDEC standard part).
- (R) Coreboot reads and uses SPD information to initialize all memory controllers in a computer with timing, size and other properties. Coreboot is intended to act as a computer's firmware, replacing a BIOS (or UEFI-enabled BIOS).
- (R) HWiNFO, CPU-Z and Speccy are Microsoft Windows programs that read and display SPD information, including XMP and other extensions.
- (RW) Thaiphoon Burner (abandonware) is a Windows program that allows reading from and writing to SPD from memory modules up to DDR4 (including XMP). SPDtool is another piece of abandonware of similar purpose.

==== Other SMBus features ====
===== Temperature sensor =====
JEDEC has standards for SMBus-addressable temperature sensors on memory strips. TS3000 is for the independent sensor for up to DDR3. TSE2002 is the combined SPD and temperature sensor for up to DDR3. TSE2004 is the combined SPD and temperature sensor for DDR4. SPD5118 is the "hub" that integrates temperature and SPD on DDR5.

===== RGB LED control =====
Some memory modules (especially on Gaming PCs) support RGB LEDs that are controlled by proprietary SMBus commands. This allows LED color control without additional connectors and cables. Windows kernel drivers from multiple manufacturers required to control the lights have been exploited to gain access ranging from full kernel memory access, to MSR and I/O port control numerous times in 2020 alone.

=== SMBIOS ===
The SMBIOS relays data about the memory from the BIOS to the computer. This information is accessed by the dmidecode program, which runs on Linux, FreeBSD, NetBSD, OpenBSD, BeOS, Cygwin and Solaris. Again, it accesses not the SPD information, but SMBIOS information, so data may be limited or incorrect.

=== Ex situ SMBus ===
By removing the EEPROM chip and transplanting it somewhere else, one can obtain a more direct SMBus access. This helps remove the interference from chipsets.

==== Laptops and webcams ====
A not so common use for old laptops is as generic SMBus readers, as the internal EEPROM on the module can be disabled once the BIOS has read it so the bus is essentially available for use. The method used is to pull low the A0, A1 lines so the internal memory shuts down, allowing the external device to access the SMBus. Once this is done, a custom Linux build or DOS application can then access the external device. A common use is recovering data from LCD panel memory chips to retrofit a generic panel into a proprietary laptop.

A related technique is rewriting the chip on webcams often included with many laptops, as the bus speed is substantially higher. They can even be modified so that 25-series chips, commonly used in storing a motherboard's UEFI ROM, can be read and written for protection against chip failure.

On some chips it is recommended to separate write protect lines so that the onboard chips do not get wiped during reprogramming.

==== Chip generation issues ====
This unfortunately only works on DDR3 and below, as DDR4 uses a different chip model (34-series) to fit the 512-byte SPD (as opposed to the 256-byte of earlier generations). This chip interface (EE1004/TSE2004) divides its storage into two pages and requires a page-switch to read or write the whole chip.

Some chipsets also do not correctly negotiate the reading of 34-series EEPROM chips so they may even fail to read. The software may return a "Incompatible SMBus driver?" message in response.

DDR5 uses an even more complex design, the SPD5118 "hub" with another doubling of capacity.

== On older equipment ==
Some older equipment require the use of SIMMs with parallel presence detect (more commonly called simply presence detect or PD). Some of this equipment uses non-standard PD coding, IBM computers and Hewlett-Packard LaserJet and other printers in particular.

== See also ==
- Transducer electronic data sheet
