= Zen 4 =

2022 AMD 5-nanometer processor microarchitecture

AMD Zen 4

General information
- Launched: September 27, 2022; 4 years ago
- Designed by: AMD
- Common manufacturer: TSMC
- CPUID code: Family 19h

Physical specifications
- Cores: Desktop: 4 to 16 HEDT: 24 to 64 Workstation: 12 to 96 Server: 16 to 128
- Memory (RAM): DDR5
- Package: FP7; FP7r2; FP8; FL1
- Sockets: Desktop; Socket AM5; HEDT/Workstation; Socket sTR5; Server; Socket SP5; Socket SP6

Cache
- L1 cache: 64 KB (per core): 32 KB instructions; 32 KB data
- L2 cache: 1 MB (per core)
- L3 cache: 32 MB (per CCD); 96 MB (per CCD with 3D V-Cache); 16 MB (in APUs)

Architecture and classification
- Technology node: TSMC N4P; TSMC N5 (CCDs); TSMC N6 (I/O die)
- Microarchitecture: Zen
- Instruction set: AMD64 (x86-64)
- Extensions: Crypto AES, SHA; SIMD MMX-plus, SSE, SSE2, SSE3, SSSE3, SSE4.1, SSE4.2, SSE4A, FMA3, AVX, AVX2, AVX-512

Products, models, variants
- Product code names: Desktop; Raphael; Phoenix (APUs); HEDT/Workstation; Storm Peak; Thin & Light Mobile; Phoenix; Hawk Point; Extreme Mobile; Dragon Range; Server; Genoa; Genoa-X
- Brand names: Ryzen; Threadripper; Epyc

History
- Predecessors: Zen 3 Zen 3+
- Successor: Zen 5

Support status
- Supported

Zen 4 is the name for a CPU microarchitecture designed by AMD, released on September 27, 2022. It is the successor to Zen 3 and uses TSMC's N6 process for I/O dies, N5 process for CCDs, and N4 process for APUs.

Zen 4 powers Ryzen 7000 performance desktop processors (codenamed "Raphael"), Ryzen 8000G series mainstream desktop APUs (codenamed "Phoenix"), and Ryzen Threadripper 7000 series HEDT and workstation processors (codenamed "Storm Peak"). It is also used in extreme mobile processors (codenamed "Dragon Range"), thin & light mobile processors (codenamed "Phoenix" and "Hawk Point"), as well as EPYC 8004/9004 server processors (codenamed "Siena", "Genoa" and "Bergamo"). Zen 4 is the first microarchitecture whose chips (Ryzen 7000) use the AM5 motherboard socket.

== Features ==
Like its predecessor, Zen 4 in its Desktop Ryzen variants features one or two Core Complex Dies (CCDs) built on TSMC's 5 nm process and one I/O die built on 6 nm. Previously, the I/O die on Zen 3 was built on GlobalFoundries' 14 nm process for EPYC and 12 nm process for Ryzen. Zen 4's I/O die includes integrated RDNA 2 graphics for the first time on any Zen architecture. Zen 4 marks the first utilization of the 5 nm process for x86-based desktop processors and also marks the return of 5.0 GHz clock rate to any AMD processors for the first time since the AMD FX-9590.

On all platforms, Zen 4 supports only DDR5 memory and LPDDR5X in mobile, with support for DDR4 and LPDDR4X dropped. Additionally, Zen 4 supports new AMD EXPO SPD profiles for more comprehensive memory tuning and overclocking by the RAM manufacturers. Unlike Intel's XMP, EXPO is marketed as an open, license- and royalty-free standard for describing memory kit parameters, such as operating frequency, timings and voltages. It allows to encode a wider set of timings to achieve better performance and compatibility. However, XMP memory profiles are still supported. EXPO can also support Intel processors.

All Zen 4 Ryzen desktop processors feature 28 (24 usable + 4 reserved) PCI Express 5.0 lanes. This means that a discrete GPU can be connected by 16 PCIe lanes or two GPUs by 8 PCIe lanes each. Additionally, there are now 2 x 4 lane PCIe interfaces, most often used for M.2 storage devices. Whether the lanes connecting the GPUs in the mechanical x16 slots are executed as PCIe 4.0 or PCIe 5.0 can be configured by the mainboard manufacturers. Finally, 4 PCIe 5.0 lanes are reserved for connecting the south bridge chip or chipset.

Zen 4 is the first AMD microarchitecture to support AVX-512 instruction set extensions. 512-bit vector instructions are split in two and executed by the 256-bit SIMD execution units internally. The two halves execute in parallel on a pair of execution units and are still tracked as a single micro-OP (except for stores), which means the execution latency isn't doubled compared to 256-bit vector instructions. There are four 256-bit execution units, which gives a maximum throughput of two 512-bit vector instructions per clock cycle, e.g. one multiplication and one addition. The maximum number of instructions per clock cycle is doubled for vectors of 256 bits or less. Load and store units are also 256 bits each, retaining the throughput of up to two 256-bit loads or one store per cycle that was supported by Zen 3. This translates to up to one 512-bit load per cycle or one 512-bit store per two cycles.

Other features and improvements, compared to Zen 3, include:

- L1 Branch Target Buffer (BTB) size increased by 50%, to 1.5K entries. Each entry is now able to store up to two branch targets, provided that the first branch is a conditional branch and the second branch is located within the same aligned 64-byte cache line as the first one.
- L2 BTB increased to 7K entries.
- Improved direct and indirect branch predictors.
- OP cache size increased by 69%, from 4K to 6.75K OPs. The OP cache is now able to produce up to 9 macro-OPs per cycle (up from 6).
- Re-order buffer (ROB) is increased by 25%, to 320 instructions.
- Integer register file increased to 224 registers, FP/vector register file increased to 192 registers. FP/vector register file widened to 512 bits to support AVX-512. Added a new mask register file, capable of storing 68 mask registers.
- Load queue size increased by 22%, to 88 pending loads.
- L2 cache is doubled, from 512 KiB to 1 MiB per core, 8-way associative.
- Automatic IBRS, where indirect branch restricted speculation mode is automatically enabled and disabled when control enters and leaves Ring 0 (kernel mode). This reduces the cost of user/kernel mode transitions.
- ~13% IPC increase on average.
- Up to 5.7 GHz max core frequency.
- Memory speeds up to DDR5-5200 and LPDDR5X-7500 are officially supported.
- In Ryzen 7000 desktop processors and Ryzen 7045HX mobile processors, the integrated GPU contains two RDNA 2 Compute Units running at up to 2.2 GHz.
- Supports up to four display outputs, including HDMI 2.1 and DisplayPort 2 interfaces, but possible to attach more displays with discrete GPU.
- 5-level memory paging support for page table

== Products ==
=== Desktop ===
==== Raphael ====
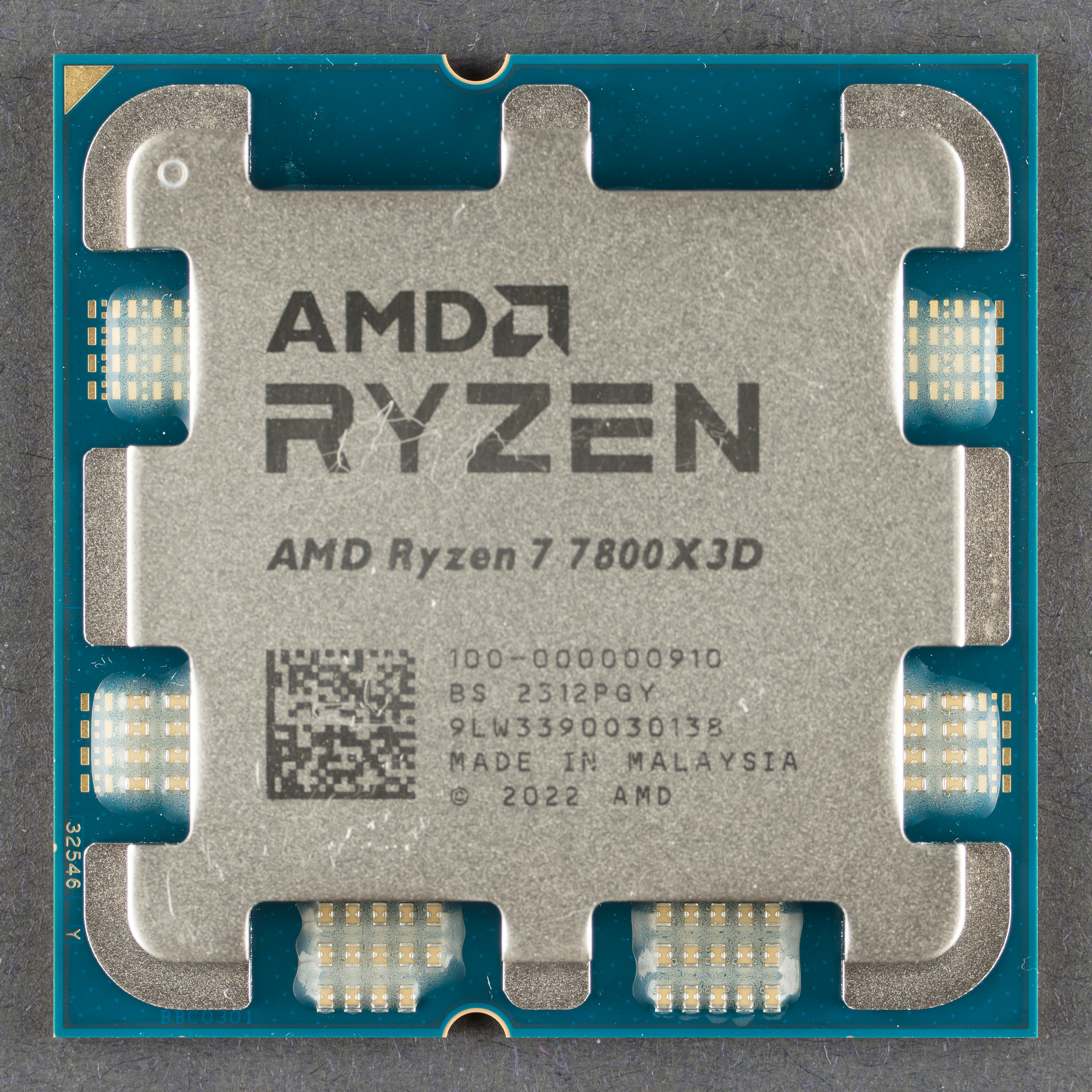
Ryzen 7 7800X3D

On August 29, 2022, AMD announced four Zen 4-based Ryzen 7000 series desktop processors. The four Ryzen 7000 processors that were launched on September 27, 2022 consist of the Ryzen 5 7600X, Ryzen 7 7700X, and two Ryzen 9 CPUs: the 7900X and 7950X. The processors feature between 6 and 16 cores.

A further three models were added to the Ryzen 7000 desktop processors lineup on January 10, 2023, after a keynote by AMD at CES that announced them alongside 3D V-Cache variants of Ryzen 7 and Ryzen 9 processors, which drop the X in the name of the first CPUs in the lineup. These three models are the Ryzen 5 7600, Ryzen 7 7700, and Ryzen 9 7900, which feature a lower TDP of 65 W, and come bundled with stock coolers, unlike the X-suffix processors.

The Ryzen 9 7900X3D and 7950X3D processors with 3D V-Cache were released on February 28, 2023, followed by the Ryzen 7 7800X3D on April 6.

Common features of Ryzen 7000 desktop CPUs:

- Socket: AM5.
- All the CPUs support DDR5-5200 RAM in dual-channel mode in 2x1R and 2x2R configuration, but only DDR5-3600 for 4x1R and 4x2R.
- All the CPUs support 28 PCIe 5.0 lanes. 4 of the lanes are reserved as link to the chipset.
- Includes integrated RDNA 2 GPU on the I/O die with 2 CUs and clock speeds of 400 MHz (base), 2.2 GHz (boost). (Note: Self identifies as "AMD Radeon Graphics". See RDNA 2 § Integrated graphics processors (iGPs).) Models with "F" suffixes are without iGPUs.
- L1 cache: 64 KB (32 KB data + 32 KB instruction) per core.
- L2 cache: 1 MB per core.
- Fabrication process: TSMC N5 FinFET (N6 FinFET for the I/O die).

Branding and model		Cores (threads)	Clock rate (GHz)		L3 cache (total)	Chiplets	Core config (Note: Core Complexes (CCX) × cores per CCX)	TDP	Thermal solution	Release date	MSRP
Branding and model		Cores (threads)	Base	Boost	L3 cache (total)	Chiplets	Core config	TDP	Thermal solution	Release date	MSRP
Ryzen 9	7950X3D	16 (32)	4.2	5.7	128 MB (Note: Only one of the two CCXes has additional 64 MB 3D V-Cache. Only the CCX without 3D V-Cache will be able to reach the maximum boost clocks. The CCX with 3D V-Cache will clock lower.)	2 × CCD; 1 × I/OD	2 × 8	120 W	—N/a	Feb 28, 2023	US $699
Ryzen 9	7950X	16 (32)	4.5	5.7	64 MB	2 × CCD; 1 × I/OD	2 × 8	170 W	—N/a	Sep 27, 2022	US $699
Ryzen 9	7900X3D	12 (24)	4.4	5.6	128 MB	2 × CCD; 1 × I/OD	2 × 6	120 W	—N/a	Feb 28, 2023	US $599
Ryzen 9	7900X	12 (24)	4.7	5.6	64 MB	2 × CCD; 1 × I/OD	2 × 6	170 W	—N/a	Sep 27, 2022	US $549
Ryzen 9	7900	12 (24)	3.7	5.4	64 MB	2 × CCD; 1 × I/OD	2 × 6	65 W	Wraith Prism, None (Note: On August 1, 2025, AMD downgraded or ceased including coolers on select models, as a result of its discontinuation of the Wraith Prism and Wraith Spire.)	Jan 10, 2023	US $429
Ryzen 9	PRO 7945	12 (24)	3.7	5.4	64 MB	2 × CCD; 1 × I/OD	2 × 6	65 W	Wraith Spire, Wraith Stealth	Jun 13, 2023	OEM
Ryzen 7	7800X3D	8 (16)	4.2	5.0	96 MB	1 × CCD; 1 × I/OD	1 × 8	120 W	—N/a	Apr 6, 2023	US $449
Ryzen 7	7700X3D	8 (16)	4.0	4.5	96 MB	1 × CCD; 1 × I/OD	1 × 8	120 W	—N/a	Jul 16, 2026	US $329
Ryzen 7	7700X	8 (16)	4.5	5.4	32 MB	1 × CCD; 1 × I/OD	1 × 8	105 W	—N/a	Sep 27, 2022	US $399
Ryzen 7	7700	8 (16)	3.8	5.3	32 MB	1 × CCD; 1 × I/OD	1 × 8	65 W	Wraith Prism, None	Jan 10, 2023	US $329
Ryzen 7	PRO 7745	8 (16)	3.8	5.3	32 MB	1 × CCD; 1 × I/OD	1 × 8	65 W	Wraith Spire, Wraith Stealth	Jun 13, 2023	OEM
Ryzen 5	7600X3D	6 (12)	4.1	4.7	96 MB	1 × CCD; 1 × I/OD	1 × 6	65 W	—N/a	Aug 31, 2024 (Note: Release date for US, where it is only sold though MicroCenter. In Europe it is only available in Germany, and only through MindFactory, which released it on September 5, 2024.)	US $299
Ryzen 5	7600X	6 (12)	4.7	5.3	32 MB	1 × CCD; 1 × I/OD	1 × 6	105 W	—N/a	Sep 27, 2022	US $299
Ryzen 5	7600	6 (12)	3.8	5.1	32 MB	1 × CCD; 1 × I/OD	1 × 6	65 W	Wraith Stealth	Jan 10, 2023	US $229
Ryzen 5	PRO 7645	6 (12)	3.8	5.1	32 MB	1 × CCD; 1 × I/OD	1 × 6	65 W	Wraith Spire, Wraith Stealth	Jun 13, 2023	OEM
Ryzen 5	7500X3D	6 (12)	4.0	4.5	96 MB	1 × CCD; 1 × I/OD	1 × 6	65 W	—N/a	Nov 12, 2025	OEM
Ryzen 5	7500	6 (12)	3.7	5.0	32 MB	1 × CCD; 1 × I/OD	1 × 6	65 W	Wraith Stealth	Sep 10, 2026	US $189
Ryzen 5	7500F	6 (12)	3.7	5.0	32 MB	1 × CCD; 1 × I/OD	1 × 6	65 W	Wraith Stealth	Jul 22, 2023	US $179
Ryzen 5	7400F (Note: The 7400F uses thermal paste between the silicon and the integrated heat spreader, whereas all other 7000 series models use soldered thermal interface material instead.)	6 (12)	3.7	4.7	32 MB	1 × CCD; 1 × I/OD	1 × 6	65 W	Wraith Stealth	Jan 9, 2025	CNY 849 (Mainland China); APJ Only
Ryzen 5	7400 (Note: Model also available as PRO version as PRO 7445.)	6 (12)	3.3	4.3	16 MB	1 × CCD; 1 × I/OD	1 × 6	65 W	Wraith Stealth	Sep 16, 2025	TBA

==== Phoenix ====
The Phoenix desktop APU's were launched on January 8, 2024 as the "Ryzen 8000G" series for the AM5 socket and marketed as first desktop processor to feature a dedicated AI Accelerator branded as "Ryzen AI".

Common features of Ryzen 8000G desktop APUs:

- Socket: AM5.
- All the CPUs support DDR5-5200 RAM in dual-channel mode in 2x1R and 2x2R configuration, but only DDR5-3600 for 4x1R and 4x2R.
- L1 cache: 64 KB (32 KB data + 32 KB instruction) per core.
- L2 cache: 1 MB per core.
- Models with Zen 4c cores (codenamed Phoenix 2) support 14 PCIe 4.0 lanes, while models without them support 20 lanes. 4 of the lanes are reserved as link to the chipset.
- Includes integrated RDNA 3 GPU.
- Includes XDNA AI Engine (Ryzen AI) on models without Zen 4c cores.
- Fabrication process: TSMC 4 nm FinFET.

Branding and model		CPU							GPU			NPU	TDP	Thermal solution	Release date	MSRP
Branding and model		Cores (threads)			Clock rate (GHz)		L3 cache (total)	Core config (Note: Core Complexes (CCX) × cores per CCX, or Zen 4 + Zen 4c cores)	Model	Core config (Note: Unified shaders : Texture mapping units : Render output units : Ray accelerators : AI accelerators and Compute units (CU)) (Note: GPUs based on RDNA 3 have dual-issue stream processors so that up to two shader instructions can be executed per clock cycle under certain parallelism conditions.)	Clock (GHz)	NPU	TDP	Thermal solution	Release date	MSRP
Branding and model		Total	Zen 4	Zen 4c	Base	Boost	L3 cache (total)	Core config	Model	Core config	Clock (GHz)	NPU	TDP	Thermal solution	Release date	MSRP
Ryzen 7	8700G (Note: Model also available as PRO version as 8300G, 8300GE, 8500G, 8500GE, 8600G, 8700G.)	8 (16)	8 (16)	—N/a	4.2	5.1	16 MB	1 × 8	780M	12 CUs; 768:48:24:12	2.9	Ryzen AI; Up to 16 TOPS	65 W	Wraith Spire (before Aug 1, 2025); Wraith Stealth (since Aug 1, 2025)	Jan 31, 2024	US $329
Ryzen 7	PRO 8700GE	8 (16)	8 (16)	—N/a	3.6	5.1	16 MB	1 × 8	780M	12 CUs; 768:48:24:12	2.7	Ryzen AI; Up to 16 TOPS	35 W	—N/a	Apr 16, 2024	US $299
Ryzen 5	8600G	6 (12)	6 (12)	—N/a	4.3	5.0	16 MB	1 × 6	760M	8 CUs; 512:32:16:8	2.8	Ryzen AI; Up to 16 TOPS	65 W	Wraith Stealth	Jan 31, 2024	US $229
Ryzen 5	PRO 8600GE	6 (12)	6 (12)	—N/a	3.9	5.0	16 MB	1 × 6	760M	8 CUs; 512:32:16:8	2.6	Ryzen AI; Up to 16 TOPS	35 W	—N/a	Apr 16, 2024	OEM
Ryzen 5	8500G	6 (12)	2 (4)	4 (8)	4.1 / 3.2 (Note: Zen 4 cores' base frequency / Zen 4c cores' base frequency)	5.0 / 3.7 (Note: Zen 4 cores' boost frequency / Zen 4c cores' boost frequency)	16 MB	2 + 4	740M	4 CUs; 256:16:8:4	2.8	No	65 W	Wraith Stealth	Jan 31, 2024	US $179
Ryzen 5	8500GE	6 (12)	2 (4)	4 (8)	3.9 / 3.1	5.0 / 3.7	16 MB	2 + 4	740M	4 CUs; 256:16:8:4	2.8	No	35 W	—N/a	Apr 16, 2024	OEM
Ryzen 3	8300G	4 (8)	1 (2)	3 (6)	4.0 / 3.2	4.9 / 3.6	8 MB	1 + 3	740M	4 CUs; 256:16:8:4	2.6	No	65 W	Wraith Stealth	Jan 2024 (OEM) / Q1 2024 (retail)	OEM / TBA
Ryzen 3	8300GE	4 (8)	1 (2)	3 (6)	4.0 / 3.2	4.9 / 3.6	8 MB	1 + 3	740M	4 CUs; 256:16:8:4	2.6	No	35 W	—N/a	Apr 16, 2024	OEM

On April 1, 2024, AMD quietly released the Ryzen 8000 series of desktop processors without integrated graphics.

Common features of Ryzen 8000 desktop CPUs:

- Socket: AM5.
- All the CPUs support DDR5-5200 RAM in dual-channel mode in 2x1R and 2x2R configuration, but only DDR5-3600 for 4x1R and 4x2R.
- L1 cache: 64 KB (32 KB data + 32 KB instruction) per core.
- L2 cache: 1 MB per core.
- All the CPUs support 20 PCIe 4.0 lanes. 4 of the lanes are reserved as link to the chipset.
- No integrated graphics.
- Fabrication process: TSMC 4 nm FinFET.

Branding and model		Cores (threads)	Clock rate (GHz)		L3 cache (total)	NPU	TDP	Core config (Note: Core Complexes (CCX) × cores per CCX.)	Thermal solution	Release date	MSRP
Branding and model		Cores (threads)	Base	Boost	L3 cache (total)	NPU	TDP	Core config	Thermal solution	Release date	MSRP
Ryzen 7	8700F	8 (16)	4.1	5.0	16 MB	Yes	65 W	1 × 8	Wraith Stealth	April 1, 2024	OEM
Ryzen 5	8400F	6 (12)	4.2	4.7	16 MB	No	65 W	1 × 6	Wraith Stealth	April 1, 2024	OEM

==== Storm Peak ====
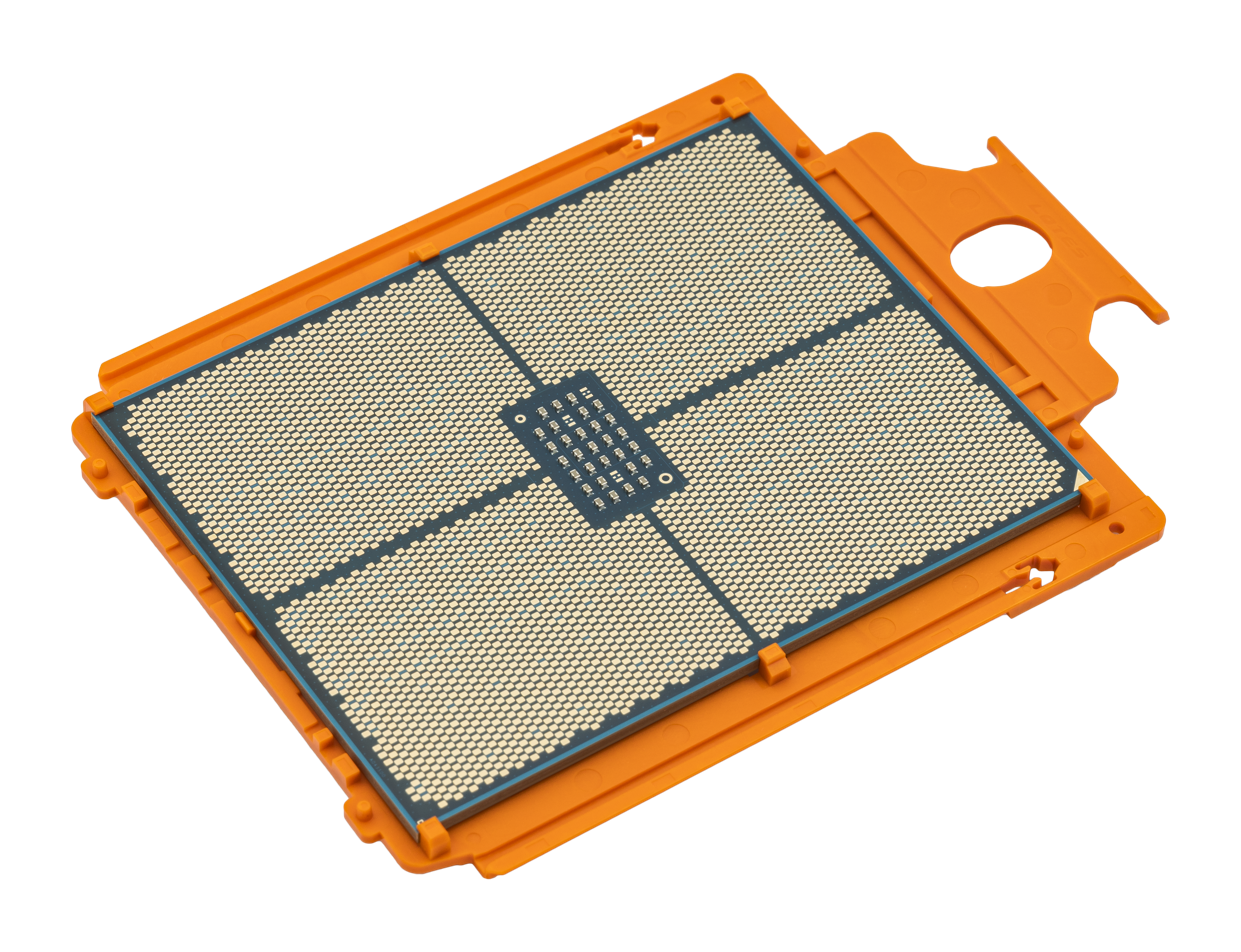
Bottom of an AMD Ryzen Threadripper 7970X

Storm Peak is the codename given to Ryzen Threadripper 7000X HEDT and Ryzen Threadripper PRO 7000WX workstation processors, announced by AMD on October 19, 2023, and released on November 21, 2023. The Threadripper 7000X HEDT lineup consists of three models ranging from 24 to 64 cores, while the Threadripper PRO 7000WX workstation lineup encompasses six models ranging from 12 to 96 cores.

Common features of Ryzen 7000 HEDT/workstation CPUs:

- Socket: sTR5.
- Threadripper CPUs support DDR5-5200 in quad-channel mode while Threadripper PRO CPUs support DDR5-5200 in octa-channel mode with ECC support.
- L1 cache: 64 KB (32 KB data + 32 KB instruction) per core.
- L2 cache: 1 MB per core.
- Threadripper CPUs support 48 PCIe 5.0 and 24 PCIe 4.0 lanes while Threadripper PRO CPUs support 128 PCIe 5.0 lanes. In addition, all processor models have 4 PCIe 4.0 lanes reserved as link to the chipset.
- No integrated graphics.
- Fabrication process: TSMC 5FF.

Branding and model		Cores (threads)	Clock rate (GHz)		L3 cache (total)	TDP	Chiplets	Core config (Note: Core Complexes (CCXs) × cores per CCX)	Release date	MSRP
Branding and model		Cores (threads)	Base	Boost	L3 cache (total)	TDP	Chiplets	Core config	Release date	MSRP
Ryzen Threadripper PRO	7995WX	96 (192)	2.5	5.1	384 MB	350 W	12 × CCD; 1 × I/OD	12 × 8	Nov 21, 2023	US $9999
Ryzen Threadripper PRO	7985WX	64 (128)	3.2	5.1	256 MB	350 W	8 × CCD; 1 × I/OD	8 × 8	Nov 21, 2023	US $7349
Ryzen Threadripper PRO	7975WX	32 (64)	4.0	5.3	128 MB	350 W	4 × CCD; 1 × I/OD	4 × 8	Nov 21, 2023	US $3899
Ryzen Threadripper PRO	7965WX	24 (48)	4.2	5.3	128 MB	350 W	4 × CCD; 1 × I/OD	4 × 6	Nov 21, 2023	US $2649
Ryzen Threadripper PRO	7955WX	16 (32)	4.5	5.3	64 MB	350 W	2 × CCD; 1 × I/OD	2 × 8	Nov 21, 2023	US $1899
Ryzen Threadripper PRO	7945WX	12 (24)	4.7	5.3	64 MB	350 W	2 × CCD; 1 × I/OD	2 × 6	Nov 21, 2023	US $1399
Ryzen Threadripper	7980X	64 (128)	3.2	5.1	256 MB	350 W	8 × CCD; 1 × I/OD	8 × 8	Nov 21, 2023	US $4999
Ryzen Threadripper	7970X	32 (64)	4.0	5.3	128 MB	350 W	4 × CCD; 1 × I/OD	4 × 8	Nov 21, 2023	US $2499
Ryzen Threadripper	7960X	24 (48)	4.2	5.3	128 MB	350 W	4 × CCD; 1 × I/OD	4 × 6	Nov 21, 2023	US $1499

=== Mobile ===
On January 4, 2023, AMD announced its Phoenix and Dragon Range series of mobile processors based on Zen 4 at the 2023 Consumer Electronics Show (CES). The Phoenix processors target the mainstream notebook segment, feature an AI accelerator branded as "Ryzen AI", similar to Apple's Neural Engine, and are of a monolithic chip design, while the Dragon Range processors target the high-end segment, providing core counts up to 16 cores and 32 threads, and are built on a multi-chip module design, utilizing an I/O die and up to two core complex dies (CCDs).

==== Phoenix ====
The Phoenix mobile processors are named as the "Ryzen 7040" series, and include U, H, and HS-suffix variants.

Common features of Ryzen 7040 notebook APUs:

- Socket: FP7, FP7r2, FP8.
- All the CPUs support DDR5-5600 or LPDDR5X-7500 in dual-channel mode.
- L1 cache: 64 KB (32 KB data + 32 KB instruction) per core.
- L2 cache: 1 MB per core.
- All models support AVX-512 using a half-width 256-bit FPU.
- PCIe 4.0 support.
- Native USB 40Gbps (USB4) Ports: 2
- Native USB 10Gbps (USB 3.2 Gen 2 operation mode) Ports: 2
- Includes integrated RDNA 3 GPU.
- Some models include XDNA AI Engine (Ryzen AI) NPU capable of 10 TOPS.
- Fabrication process: TSMC N4 FinFET.

Branding and model		CPU							GPU		NPU (Ryzen AI)	TDP	Release date
Branding and model		Cores (threads)			Clock (GHz)		L3 cache (total)	Core config (Note: Core Complexes (CCX) × cores per CCX or Zen 4 + Zen 4c cores)	Model	Clock (GHz)	NPU (Ryzen AI)	TDP	Release date
Branding and model		Total	Zen 4	Zen 4c	Base	Boost	L3 cache (total)	Core config	Model	Clock (GHz)	NPU (Ryzen AI)	TDP	Release date
Ryzen 9	(PRO) 7940HS	8 (16)	8 (16)	—N/a	4.0	5.2	16 MB	1 × 8	780M; 12 CU	2.8	Yes; 10 TOPS	35-54 W	April 30, 2023 (Note: PRO versions launched on 13 June 2023.)
Ryzen 9	7940H (Note: China-only version of the HS SKU that lacks support for AMD EXPO and FreeSync technologies.)	8 (16)	8 (16)	—N/a	4.0	5.2	16 MB	1 × 8	780M; 12 CU	2.8	Yes; 10 TOPS	35-54 W	April 30, 2023
Ryzen 7	(PRO) 7840HS	8 (16)	8 (16)	—N/a	3.8	5.1	16 MB	1 × 8	780M; 12 CU	2.7	Yes; 10 TOPS	35-54 W	April 30, 2023
Ryzen 7	7840H	8 (16)	8 (16)	—N/a	3.8	5.1	16 MB	1 × 8	780M; 12 CU	2.7	Yes; 10 TOPS	35-54 W	April 30, 2023
Ryzen 7	(PRO) 7840U	8 (16)	8 (16)	—N/a	3.3	5.1	16 MB	1 × 8	780M; 12 CU	2.7	Yes; 10 TOPS	15-30 W	May 3, 2023
Ryzen 7	7445HS	6 (12)	2 (4)	4 (8)	3.2	4.7	16 MB	2 + 4	740M; 4 CU	2.7	No	20-40 W	May 3, 2023
Ryzen 5	(PRO) 7640HS	6 (12)	6 (12)	—N/a	4.3	5.0	16 MB	1 × 6	760M; 8 CU	2.6	Yes; 10 TOPS	35-54 W	April 30, 2023
Ryzen 5	7640H	6 (12)	6 (12)	—N/a	4.3	5.0	16 MB	1 × 6	760M; 8 CU	2.6	Yes; 10 TOPS	35-54 W	April 30, 2023
Ryzen 5	(PRO) 7640U	6 (12)	6 (12)	—N/a	3.5	4.9	16 MB	1 × 6	760M; 8 CU	2.6	Yes; 10 TOPS	15-30 W	May 3, 2023
Ryzen 5	(PRO) 7545U	6 (12)	2 (4)	4 (8)	3.7 / 3.0 (Note: Zen 4 cores' base frequency / Zen 4c cores' base frequency)	4.9 / 3.5 (Note: Zen 4 cores' boost frequency / Zen 4c cores' boost frequency)	16 MB	2 + 4	740M; 4 CU	2.8	No	15-30 W	November 2, 2023
Ryzen 5	(PRO) 7540U	6 (12)	6 (12)	—N/a	3.2	4.9	16 MB	1 × 6	740M; 4 CU	2.5	No	15-30 W	May 3, 2023
Ryzen 3	7440U	4 (8)	1 (2)	3 (6)	3.6 / 2.8	4.7 / 3.3	8 MB	1 + 3	740M; 4 CU	2.5	No	15-30 W	May 3, 2023

==== Dragon Range ====
The Dragon Range mobile processors are named as the "Ryzen 7045" series, and consist of HX, and HX3D suffix models only.

Common features of Ryzen 7045 notebook CPUs:

- Socket: FL1.
- All the CPUs support DDR5-5200 in dual-channel mode.
- L1 cache: 64 KB (32 KB data + 32 KB instruction) per core.
- L2 cache: 1 MB per core.
- All the CPUs support 28 PCIe 5.0 lanes.
- Native USB 40Gbps (USB4) Ports: 0
- Native USB 10Gbps (USB 3.2 Gen 2 operation mode) Ports: 4
- Includes integrated RDNA 2 GPU on the I/O die with 2 CUs and clock speeds of 400 MHz (base), 2.2 GHz (boost) (Note: Self identifies as "AMD Radeon 610M". See RDNA 2 § Integrated graphics processors (iGPs).).
- Fabrication process: TSMC N5 FinFET (N6 FinFET for the I/O and graphics die).

Branding and model		Cores (threads)	Clock (GHz)		L3 cache (total)	Chiplets	Core config (Note: Core Complexes (CCX) × cores per CCX)	TDP	Release date
Branding and model		Cores (threads)	Base	Boost	L3 cache (total)	Chiplets	Core config	TDP	Release date
Ryzen 9	7945HX3D	16 (32)	2.3	5.4	128 MB (Note: Only one of the two CCXes has additional 64 MB of 3D V-Cache. Only the CCX without 3D V-Cache will be able to reach the maximum boost clocks. The CCX with 3D V-Cache will clock lower.)	2 × CCD; 1 × I/OD	2 × 8	55–75 W	July 27, 2023
Ryzen 9	7945HX	16 (32)	2.5	5.4	64 MB	2 × CCD; 1 × I/OD	2 × 8	55–75 W	February 28, 2023
Ryzen 9	7940HX	16 (32)	2.4	5.2	64 MB	2 × CCD; 1 × I/OD	2 × 8	55–75 W	January 17, 2024
Ryzen 9	7845HX	12 (24)	3.0	5.2	64 MB	2 × CCD; 1 × I/OD	2 × 6	45–75 W	February 28, 2023
Ryzen 7	7840HX	12 (24)	2.9	5.1	64 MB	2 × CCD; 1 × I/OD	2 × 6	45–75 W	January 17, 2024
Ryzen 7	7745HX	8 (16)	3.6	5.1	32 MB	1 × CCD; 1 × I/OD	1 × 8	45–75 W	February 28, 2023
Ryzen 5	7645HX	6 (12)	4.0	5.0	32 MB	1 × CCD; 1 × I/OD	1 × 6	45–75 W	February 28, 2023

==== Dragon Range Refresh ====
Dragon Range Refresh is a Refresh of Dragon Range mobile processors, which are named as the "Ryzen 8045" series.

Common features of Ryzen 8045 notebook CPUs:

- Socket: FL1.
- All the CPUs support DDR5-5200 in dual-channel mode.
- L1 cache: 64 KB (32 KB data + 32 KB instruction) per core.
- L2 cache: 1 MB per core.
- All the CPUs support 28 PCIe 5.0 lanes.
- Native USB 40Gbps (USB4) Ports: 0
- Native USB 10Gbps (USB 3.2 Gen 2 operation mode) Ports: 4
- Includes integrated RDNA 2 GPU on the I/O die with 2 CUs and clock speeds of 400 MHz (base), 2.2 GHz (boost) (Note: Self identifies as "AMD Radeon 610M". See RDNA 2 § Integrated graphics processors (iGPs).).
- Fabrication process: TSMC N5 FinFET (N6 FinFET for the I/O and graphics die).

Branding and model		Cores (threads)	Clock (GHz)		L3 cache (total)	Chiplets	Core config (Note: Core Complexes (CCX) × cores per CCX)	TDP	Release date
Branding and model		Cores (threads)	Base	Boost	L3 cache (total)	Chiplets	Core config	TDP	Release date
Ryzen 9	8945HX	16 (32)	2.5	5.4	64 MB	2 × CCD; 1 × I/OD	2 × 8	55–75 W	April 23, 2025
Ryzen 9	8940HX	16 (32)	2.4	5.3	64 MB	2 × CCD; 1 × I/OD	2 × 8	55–75 W	April 23, 2025
Ryzen 7	8840HX	12 (24)	2.9	5.1	64 MB	2 × CCD; 1 × I/OD	2 × 6	45–75 W	April 23, 2025
Ryzen 7	8745HX	8 (16)	3.6	5.1	32 MB	1 × CCD; 1 × I/OD	1 × 8	45–75 W	April 23, 2025

==== Hawk Point ====
Hawk Point is a refresh of Phoenix mobile processors, named as the "Ryzen 8040" and "Ryzen 8045" series, released on December 6, 2023. It features a 60% faster NPU compared to the 7040 series.

Key features of Ryzen 8040 notebook APUs:

- Socket: BGA (FP7, FP7r2 or FP8 type packages).
- All models support DDR5-5600 or LPDDR5X-7500 in dual-channel mode.
- CPU uses Zen4 cores (Phoenix) or a combination of Zen4 and Zen4c cores (Phoenix2).
- GPU uses the RDNA 3 (Navi 3) architecture.
- Some models include first-generation Ryzen AI NPU (XDNA) capable of 16 TOPS.
- All models support AVX-512 using a half-width 256-bit FPU.
- PCIe 4.0 support.
- Native USB 40Gbps (USB4) Ports: 2
- Native USB 10Gbps (USB 3.2 Gen 2 operation mode) Ports: 2
- Fabrication process: TSMC N4 FinFET.

Branding and model		CPU							GPU		NPU (Ryzen AI)	TDP	Release date
Branding and model		Cores (threads)			Clock (GHz)		L3 cache (total)	Core config (Note: Core Complexes (CCX) × cores per CCX or Zen 4 + Zen 4c cores)	Model	Clock (GHz)	NPU (Ryzen AI)	TDP	Release date
Branding and model		Total	Zen 4	Zen 4c	Base	Boost	L3 cache (total)	Core config	Model	Clock (GHz)	NPU (Ryzen AI)	TDP	Release date
Ryzen 9	8945HS	8 (16)	8 (16)	—	4.0	5.2	16 MB	1 × 8	780M 12 CU	2.8	Yes; 16 TOPS	35-54 W	December 6, 2023
Ryzen 7	8845HS	8 (16)	8 (16)	—	3.8	5.1	16 MB	1 × 8	780M 12 CU	2.7	Yes; 16 TOPS	35-54 W	December 6, 2023
Ryzen 7	8840HS	8 (16)	8 (16)	—	3.3	5.1	16 MB	1 × 8	780M 12 CU	2.7	Yes; 16 TOPS	20-30 W	December 6, 2023
Ryzen 7	8840U	8 (16)	8 (16)	—	3.3	5.1	16 MB	1 × 8	780M 12 CU	2.7	Yes; 16 TOPS	15-30 W	December 6, 2023
Ryzen 7	8745HS	8 (16)	8 (16)	—	3.8	4.9	16 MB	1 × 8	780M 12 CU	2.6	No	35–54 W	?
Ryzen 7	8745H	8 (16)	8 (16)	—	3.8	4.9	16 MB	1 × 8	780M 12 CU	2.6	No	35–54 W	?
Ryzen 5	8645HS	6 (12)	6 (12)	—	4.3	5.0	16 MB	1 × 6	760M 8 CU	2.6	Yes; 16 TOPS	35-54 W	December 6, 2023
Ryzen 5	8640HS	6 (12)	6 (12)	—	3.5	4.9	16 MB	1 × 6	760M 8 CU	2.6	Yes; 16 TOPS	20-30 W	December 6, 2023
Ryzen 5	8640U	6 (12)	6 (12)	—	3.5	4.9	16 MB	1 × 6	760M 8 CU	2.6	Yes; 16 TOPS	15-30 W	December 6, 2023
Ryzen 5	8540U	6 (12)	2 (4)	4 (8)	3.7 / 3.0 (Note: Zen 4 cores' base frequency / Zen 4c cores' base frequency)	4.9 / 3.5 (Note: Zen 4 cores' boost frequency / Zen 4c cores' boost frequency)	16 MB	2 + 4	740M 4 CU	2.8	No	15-30 W	?
Ryzen 3	8440U	4 (8)	1 (2)	3 (6)	3.6 / 2.8	4.7 / 3.3	8 MB	1 + 3	740M 4 CU	2.5	No	15-30 W	?

==== Hawk Point Refresh ====
Hawk Point Refresh is a Refresh of Hawk Point mobile processors, named as the "Ryzen 200" series similar to Intel Core Ultra model numbering, specification similar to Hawk Point, released on Q2 2025.

Branding and Model		CPU							GPU		NPU (Ryzen AI)	TDP	Release date
Branding and Model		Cores (threads)			Clock (GHz)		L3 cache (total)	Core config	Model	Clock (GHz)	NPU (Ryzen AI)	TDP	Release date
Branding and Model		Total	Zen 4	Zen 4c	Base	Boost	L3 cache (total)	Core config	Model	Clock (GHz)	NPU (Ryzen AI)	TDP	Release date
Ryzen 9	270	8 (16)	8 (16)	—N/a	4.0	5.2	16 MB	1 × 8	780M; 12 CU	2.8	16 TOPS	35–54 W	Q2 2025
Ryzen 7	260	8 (16)	8 (16)	—N/a	3.8	5.1	16 MB	1 × 8	780M; 12 CU	2.7	16 TOPS	35–54 W	Q2 2025
Ryzen 7	(PRO) 250	8 (16)	8 (16)	—N/a	3.3	5.1	16 MB	1 × 8	780M; 12 CU	2.7	16 TOPS	15–30 W	Q2 2025
Ryzen 5	240	6 (12)	6 (12)	—N/a	4.3	5.0	16 MB	1 × 6	760M; 8 CU	2.6	16 TOPS	35–54 W	Q2 2025
Ryzen 5	(PRO) 230	6 (12)	6 (12)	—N/a	3.5	4.9	16 MB	1 × 6	760M; 8 CU	2.6	16 TOPS	15–30 W	Q2 2025
Ryzen 5	(PRO) 220	6 (12)	2 (4)	4 (8)	3.7 / 3.0	4.9 / 3.5	16 MB	2 + 4	740M; 4 CU	2.8	—N/a	15–30 W	Q2 2025
Ryzen 3	(PRO) 210	4 (8)	1 (2)	3 (6)	3.6 / 2.8	4.7 / 3.3	8 MB	1 + 3	740M; 4 CU	2.5	—N/a	15–30 W	Q2 2025

Branding and model		CPU					GPU		NPU (Ryzen AI)	TDP (cTDP)	Release date
Branding and model		Cores (threads)	Clock (GHz)		L3 cache (total)	Core config (Note: Core Complexes (CCX) × cores per CCX)	Model	Clock (GHz)	NPU (Ryzen AI)	TDP (cTDP)	Release date
Branding and model		Cores (threads)	Base	Boost	L3 cache (total)	Core config	Model	Clock (GHz)	NPU (Ryzen AI)	TDP (cTDP)	Release date
Ryzen 9	180	8 (16)	3.6	4.9	16 MB	1 × 8	780M 12 CU	2.5	Yes 16 TOPS	45 W (35−54 W)	June 2, 2026
Ryzen 7	165	6 (12)	3.3	4.7	16 MB	1 × 6	760M 8 CU	2.4	Yes 16 TOPS	28 W (15−30 W)	June 2, 2026
Ryzen 7	155	6 (12)	3.0	4.7	16 MB	1 × 6	740M 4 CU	2.6	No	35 W (15−40 W)	June 2, 2026
Ryzen 5	125	4 (8)	2.8	4.5	8 MB	1 × 4	740M 4 CU	2.3	No	28 W (15−40 W)	June 2, 2026

=== Server ===
==== Genoa, Bergamo, and Siena ====
On November 10, 2022, AMD launched the fourth generation (also known as the 9004 series) of EPYC server and data center processors based on the Zen 4 microarchitecture, codenamed Genoa. Genoa features between 16 and 96 Zen 4 cores, alongside PCIe 5.0 and DDR5, designed for enterprise and cloud data center clients.

Model	Fab	Cores (Threads)	Chiplets	Core config (Note: Core Complexes (CCX) × cores per CCX)	Clock rate (GHz)		Cache (MB)			Socket	Socket count	PCIe 5.0 lanes	Memory support	TDP	Release date	Price (USD)
Model	Fab	Cores (Threads)	Chiplets	Core config	Base	Boost	L1	L2	L3	Socket	Socket count	PCIe 5.0 lanes	DDR5 ECC	TDP	Release date	Price (USD)
Entry Level (Zen 4 cores)
4124P	TSMC; N5	4 (8)	1 × CCD; 1 × I/OD	1 × 4	3.8	5.1	0.256	4	16	AM5	1P	24	DDR5-5200 dual-channel	65 W	May 21, 2024	$149
4244P	TSMC; N5	6 (12)	1 × CCD; 1 × I/OD	1 × 6	3.8	5.1	0.384	6	32	AM5	1P	24	DDR5-5200 dual-channel	65 W	May 21, 2024	$229
4344P	TSMC; N5	8 (16)	1 × CCD; 1 × I/OD	1 × 8	3.8	5.3	0.5	8	32	AM5	1P	24	DDR5-5200 dual-channel	65 W	May 21, 2024	$329
4364P	TSMC; N5	8 (16)	1 × CCD; 1 × I/OD	1 × 8	4.5	5.4	0.5	8	32	AM5	1P	24	DDR5-5200 dual-channel	105 W	May 21, 2024	$399
4464P	TSMC; N5	12 (24)	2 × CCD; 1 × I/OD	2 × 6	3.7	5.4	0.768	12	64	AM5	1P	24	DDR5-5200 dual-channel	65 W	May 21, 2024	$429
4484PX	TSMC; N5	12 (24)	2 × CCD; 1 × I/OD	2 × 6	4.4	5.6	0.768	12	128	AM5	1P	24	DDR5-5200 dual-channel	120 W	May 21, 2024	$599
4564P	TSMC; N5	16 (32)	2 × CCD; 1 × I/OD	2 × 8	4.5	5.7	1	16	64	AM5	1P	24	DDR5-5200 dual-channel	170 W	May 21, 2024	$699
4584PX	TSMC; N5	16 (32)	2 × CCD; 1 × I/OD	2 × 8	4.2	5.7	1	16	128	AM5	1P	24	DDR5-5200 dual-channel	120 W	May 21, 2024	$699
Low Power & Edge (Zen 4c cores)
8024P	TSMC; N5	8 (16)	1 × CCD; 1 × I/OD	2 × 4	2.4	3.0	0.5	8	32	SP6	1P	96	DDR5-4800 six-channel	90 W	Sep 18, 2023	$409
8024PN	TSMC; N5	8 (16)	1 × CCD; 1 × I/OD	2 × 4	2.05	3.0	0.5	8	32	SP6	1P	96	DDR5-4800 six-channel	80 W	Sep 18, 2023	$525
8124P	TSMC; N5	16 (32)	2 × CCD; 1 × I/OD	4 × 4	2.45	3.0	1	16	64	SP6	1P	96	DDR5-4800 six-channel	125 W	Sep 18, 2023	$639
8124PN	TSMC; N5	16 (32)	2 × CCD; 1 × I/OD	4 × 4	2.0	3.0	1	16	64	SP6	1P	96	DDR5-4800 six-channel	100 W	Sep 18, 2023	$790
8224P	TSMC; N5	24 (48)	2 × CCD; 1 × I/OD	4 × 6	2.55	3.0	1.5	24	64	SP6	1P	96	DDR5-4800 six-channel	160 W	Sep 18, 2023	$855
8224PN	TSMC; N5	24 (48)	2 × CCD; 1 × I/OD	4 × 6	2.0	3.0	1.5	24	64	SP6	1P	96	DDR5-4800 six-channel	120 W	Sep 18, 2023	$1,015
8324P	TSMC; N5	32 (64)	4 × CCD; 1 × I/OD	8 × 4	2.65	3.0	2	32	128	SP6	1P	96	DDR5-4800 six-channel	180 W	Sep 18, 2023	$1,895
8324PN	TSMC; N5	32 (64)	4 × CCD; 1 × I/OD	8 × 4	2.05	3.0	2	32	128	SP6	1P	96	DDR5-4800 six-channel	130 W	Sep 18, 2023	$2,125
8434P	TSMC; N5	48 (96)	4 × CCD; 1 × I/OD	8 × 6	2.5	3.1	3	48	128	SP6	1P	96	DDR5-4800 six-channel	200 W	Sep 18, 2023	$2,700
8434PN	TSMC; N5	48 (96)	4 × CCD; 1 × I/OD	8 × 6	2.0	3.0	3	48	128	SP6	1P	96	DDR5-4800 six-channel	155 W	Sep 18, 2023	$3,150
8534P	TSMC; N5	64 (128)	4 × CCD; 1 × I/OD	8 × 8	2.3	3.1	4	64	128	SP6	1P	96	DDR5-4800 six-channel	200 W	Sep 18, 2023	$4,950
8534PN	TSMC; N5	64 (128)	4 × CCD; 1 × I/OD	8 × 8	2.0	3.1	4	64	128	SP6	1P	96	DDR5-4800 six-channel	175 W	Sep 18, 2023	$5,450
Mainstream Enterprise (Zen 4 cores)
9124	TSMC; N5	16 (32)	4 × CCD; 1 × I/OD	4 × 4	3.0	3.7	1	16	64	SP5	1P/2P	128	DDR5-4800 twelve-channel	200 W	Nov 10, 2022	$1,083
9224	TSMC; N5	24 (48)	4 × CCD; 1 × I/OD	4 × 6	2.5	3.7	1.5	24	64	SP5	1P/2P	128	DDR5-4800 twelve-channel	200 W	Nov 10, 2022	$1,825
9254	TSMC; N5	24 (48)	4 × CCD; 1 × I/OD	4 × 6	2.9	4.15	1.5	24	128	SP5	1P/2P	128	DDR5-4800 twelve-channel	220 W	Nov 10, 2022	$2,299
9334	TSMC; N5	32 (64)	4 × CCD; 1 × I/OD	4 × 8	2.7	3.9	2	32	128	SP5	1P/2P	128	DDR5-4800 twelve-channel	210 W	Nov 10, 2022	$2,990
9354	TSMC; N5	32 (64)	8 × CCD; 1 × I/OD	8 × 4	3.25	3.75	2	32	256	SP5	1P/2P	128	DDR5-4800 twelve-channel	280 W	Nov 10, 2022	$3,420
9354P	TSMC; N5	32 (64)	8 × CCD; 1 × I/OD	8 × 4	3.25	3.75	2	32	256	SP5	1P	128	DDR5-4800 twelve-channel	280 W	Nov 10, 2022	$2,730
Performance Enterprise (Zen 4 cores)
9174F	TSMC; N5	16 (32)	8 × CCD; 1 × I/OD	8 × 2	4.1	4.4	1	16	256	SP5	1P/2P	128	DDR5-4800 twelve-channel	320 W	Nov 10, 2022	$3,850
9184X	TSMC; N5	16 (32)	8 × CCD; 1 × I/OD	8 × 2	3.55	4.2	1	16	768	SP5	1P/2P	128	DDR5-4800 twelve-channel	320 W	Jun 13, 2023	$4,928
9274F	TSMC; N5	24 (48)	8 × CCD; 1 × I/OD	8 × 3	4.05	4.3	1.5	24	256	SP5	1P/2P	128	DDR5-4800 twelve-channel	320 W	Nov 10, 2022	$3,060
9374F	TSMC; N5	32 (64)	8 × CCD; 1 × I/OD	8 × 4	3.85	4.3	2	32	256	SP5	1P/2P	128	DDR5-4800 twelve-channel	320 W	Nov 10, 2022	$4,860
9384X	TSMC; N5	32 (64)	8 × CCD; 1 × I/OD	8 × 4	3.1	3.9	2	32	768	SP5	1P/2P	128	DDR5-4800 twelve-channel	320 W	Jun 13, 2023	$5,529
9474F	TSMC; N5	48 (96)	8 × CCD; 1 × I/OD	8 × 6	3.6	4.1	3	48	256	SP5	1P/2P	128	DDR5-4800 twelve-channel	360 W	Nov 10, 2022	$6,780
High Performance Computing (Zen 4 cores)
9454	TSMC; N5	48 (96)	8 × CCD; 1 × I/OD	8 × 6	2.75	3.8	3	48	256	SP5	1P/2P	128	DDR5-4800 twelve-channel	290 W	Nov 10, 2022	$5,225
9454P	TSMC; N5	48 (96)	8 × CCD; 1 × I/OD	8 × 6	2.75	3.8	3	48	256	SP5	1P	128	DDR5-4800 twelve-channel	290 W	Nov 10, 2022	$4,598
9534	TSMC; N5	64 (128)	8 × CCD; 1 × I/OD	8 × 8	2.45	3.7	4	64	256	SP5	1P/2P	128	DDR5-4800 twelve-channel	280 W	Nov 10, 2022	$8,803
9554	TSMC; N5	64 (128)	8 × CCD; 1 × I/OD	8 × 8	3.1	3.75	4	64	256	SP5	1P/2P	128	DDR5-4800 twelve-channel	360 W	Nov 10, 2022	$9,087
9554P	TSMC; N5	64 (128)	8 × CCD; 1 × I/OD	8 × 8	3.1	3.75	4	64	256	SP5	1P	128	DDR5-4800 twelve-channel	360 W	Nov 10, 2022	$7,104
9634	TSMC; N5	84 (168)	12 × CCD; 1 × I/OD	12 × 7	2.25	3.7	5.25	84	384	SP5	1P/2P	128	DDR5-4800 twelve-channel	290 W	Nov 10, 2022	$10,304
9654	TSMC; N5	96 (192)	12 × CCD; 1 × I/OD	12 × 8	2.4	3.7	6	96	384	SP5	1P/2P	128	DDR5-4800 twelve-channel	360 W	Nov 10, 2022	$11,805
9654P	TSMC; N5	96 (192)	12 × CCD; 1 × I/OD	12 × 8	2.4	3.7	6	96	384	SP5	1P	128	DDR5-4800 twelve-channel	360 W	Nov 10, 2022	$10,625
9684X	TSMC; N5	96 (192)	12 × CCD; 1 × I/OD	12 × 8	2.55	3.7	6	96	1152	SP5	1P/2P	128	DDR5-4800 twelve-channel	400 W	Jun 13, 2023	$14,756
Cloud (Zen 4c cores)
9734	TSMC; N5	112 (224)	8 × CCD; 1 × I/OD	16 × 7	2.2	3.0	7	112	256	SP5	1P/2P	128	DDR5-4800 twelve-channel	340 W	Jun 13, 2023	$9,600
9754S	TSMC; N5	128 (128)	8 × CCD; 1 × I/OD	16 × 8	2.25	3.1	8	128	256	SP5	1P/2P	128	DDR5-4800 twelve-channel	360 W	Jun 13, 2023	$10,200
9754	TSMC; N5	128 (256)	8 × CCD; 1 × I/OD	16 × 8	2.25	3.1	8	128	256	SP5	1P/2P	128	DDR5-4800 twelve-channel	360 W	Jun 13, 2023	$11,900

== Zen 4c ==
Zen 4c is a variant of Zen 4 featuring smaller Zen 4 cores with lower clock frequencies, power usage, reduced L3 cache per core, and is intended to fit a greater number of cores in a given space. Zen 4c's smaller cores and higher core counts are designed for heavily multi-threaded workloads such as cloud computing.

A Zen 4c CCD features 16 smaller Zen 4c cores, divided into two Core Complexes (CCX) of 8 cores each. The 16 core Zen 4c CCD is 9.6% larger in area than the regular 8 core Zen 4 CCD. The Zen 4c CCD die size measures at 72.7 mm^{2} compared to the 66.3 mm^{2} die area for the Zen 4 CCD. However, an individual Zen 4c core has a smaller footprint than a Zen 4 core, meaning that a larger number of smaller cores can be fitted into the CCD. A Zen 4c core is about 35.4% smaller than a Zen 4 core. In addition to the reduced core footprint, die space is further saved in the Zen 4c CCD via the use of denser 6T dual-port SRAM cells and an overall reduction of L3 cache to 16 MB per 8-core CCX. Zen 4c cores have the same sized L1 and L2 caches as Zen 4 cores but the cache die area in Zen 4c cores is lower due to using denser SRAM and slower cache. The through-silicon via (TSV) connection arrays, which are used for vertical die stacking in Zen 4 3D V-Cache CCDs, are removed from the Zen 4c CCD to save silicon space. Even though the Zen 4c core has a smaller footprint, it is still able to maintain the same IPC as the larger Zen 4 core.

"Our Zen 4c, it's our compact density that's an addition, it's a new swimlane to our cores roadmap, and it delivers the identical functionality of Zen 4 at about half of the core area."

— Mark Papermaster, AMD Chief Technical Officer (CTO)

Unlike Intel's competing Gracemont E-cores, Zen 4c features 2 threads per core with simultaneous multithreading. The IPC of a Zen 4c core is closer to that of a Zen 4 core than an Intel Gracemont E-core IPC is to a P-core. Additionally, Zen 4c supports the same instruction sets as Zen 4 such as AVX-512 which is not the case with Intel's P-cores and E-cores. Intel's Gracemont E-cores lack support for the AVX-512 instructions contained in Golden Cove P-cores.

Core		Zen 4	Zen 4c
Codename(s)	Core	Persephone	Dionysus
Codename(s)	CCD	Durango	Vindhya
Cores (threads)	per CCX	8 (16)	8 (16)
Cores (threads)	per CCD	8 (16)	16 (32)
L3 cache	per CCX	32 MB	16 MB
L3 cache	per CCD	32 MB	32 MB
Die size	Core area	3.84 mm^{2}	2.48 mm^{2}
Die size	CCD area	66.3 mm^{2}	72.7 mm^{2}

The Zen 4c core launched on June 13, 2023 with three Epyc Bergamo SKUs: 9734, 9754 and 9754S. The 9754S SKU features 128 Zen 4c cores but only 128 threads rather than the full 256 threads as simultaneous multithreading is disabled. Zen 4c launched in Epyc 8004 series processors, codenamed "Siena", on September 18, 2023. With up to 64 cores and 128 threads, Siena is designed with a lower cost platform in mind for entry-level server, edge computing, and telecommunications segments where higher energy efficiency is a priority.

Zen 4c made its debut outside of server processors in the Ryzen 7040U series, codenamed "Phoenix 2", which launched on November 2, 2023. The Ryzen 3 7440U and Ryzen 5 7545U processors feature both standard Zen 4 cores and smaller Zen 4c cores.

Turion / ULV		Node range label	x86			
Microarchi.	Step	Node range label	Microarchi.	Step		
		180 nm	K7	Athlon Classic		
		180 nm	K7	Thunderbird		
		180 nm	K7	Palomino		
		130 nm	K7	Thoroughbred		
		130 nm	K7	Barton/Thorton		
		130 nm	K8	ClawHammer		
		130 nm	K8	Newcastle		
		130 nm	K8	SledgeHammer		
K8L	Lancaster	90 nm	K8	Winchester	K8(×2)	K9
K8L	Richmond	90 nm	K8	San Diego	Toledo	~~Greyhound~~
K8L	Taylor / Trinidad	90 nm	K8	San Diego	Windsor	
K8L	Tyler	65 nm	K8	Orleans	Brisbane	
K8L	Lion	65 nm	K10	Phenom	4 cores on mainstream desktop, DDR3 introduced	
K8L	Caspian	45 nm	K10	Phenom II / Athlon II	6 cores on mainstream desktop	
14h	Bobcat	40 nm				
		32 nm	K10	Lynx		
		32 nm	K10	Llano	APU introduced; CPU and GPU on single die	
		32 nm	Bulldozer 15h	Bulldozer	8 cores on mainstream desktop	
		32 nm	Bulldozer 15h	Piledriver		
16h	Jaguar	28 nm	Bulldozer 15h	Steamroller	APU/mobile-only	
16h	Puma	28 nm	Bulldozer 15h	Excavator	APU/mobile-only, DDR4 introduced	
K12	~~K12 (ARM64)~~	14 nm	Zen	Zen	SMT introduced	
		12 nm	Zen	Zen+		
		7 nm	Zen	Zen 2	12 and 16 cores on mainstream desktop, chiplet design	
		7 nm	Zen	Zen 3	3D V-Cache variants introduced	
		6 nm	Zen	Zen 3+	Mobile-only, DDR5 introduced	
		5 nm / 4 nm	Zen	Zen 4	High core density "Cloud" (Zen xc) variants introduced	
		4 nm / 3 nm	Zen	Zen 5	Ryzen AI NPU cores introduced	
		3 nm / 2 nm	Zen	Zen 6		
		16A / 14A	Zen	Zen 7		
