= NForce 600 =

Chipset

Nvidia nForce 600
- CPU supported: Athlon 64; Core 2
- Socket supported: LGA 775; Socket AM2; Socket AM3; Socket F

Miscellaneous
- Release date(s): November 2006
- Predecessor: nForce 500
- Successor: nForce 700

The nForce 600 chipset was released in the first half of November 2006, coinciding with the GeForce 8 series launch on November 8, 2006. The nForce 600 supports Intel's LGA 775 socket and AMD's Quad FX platform and replaces the nForce 500 series.

== AMD chipsets ==
=== nForce 680a SLI ===
Specially made for the AMD Quad FX platform proposed by AMD, providing a total of two CPUs and multiple graphic cards configuration (SLI) working on a single chipset.

- AMD Dual Dual-core Socket F
- Enthusiast multiple-GPU segment
- Support for HyperTransport 2.0
- 2 northbridges as Media and Communications Processor (MCP) equal to that of nForce 570 SLI MCP, each providing one x16 and one x8 PCI-E lanes and total 28 PCI-E lanes
- Total of 4 PCI-E x16 slots
  - Two of the x16 slots receive x8 PCI-E lanes bandwidth
- Additional PCI-E slots support (PCI-E x8/x4/x1 slots)
- Support of a total of 56 PCI-E lanes
- PCI slot(s)
- Support up to 4 non-registered DDR2 DIMM modules
- Support for EPP memory
- Support up to 12 SATA harddisks
- Support RAID configurations:
  - RAID 1
  - RAID 0+1
  - RAID 5
  - JBOD
- 4 onboard Gigabit Ethernet ports
- NVIDIA FirstPacket Technology
- Support up to 20 USB 2.0 ports
- Estimated price US$ 200 or more

=== nForce 630a ===
- Socket 939/Socket AM2/Socket AM3 processors
- Mainstream IGP segment
- MCP61P northbridge, IGP renamed as GeForce 7050
- sDVO connection for optional HDMI output
- DVI, TV-out outputs
- 1 PCI Express x16 slot
- Extra PCIe x1 & PCI slots
- High-definition audio (Azalia audio)
- 10 USB 2.0 ports
- 4 SATA 3.0 Gbit/s ports with RAID
- Gigabit Ethernet

== Intel chipsets ==
=== nForce 680i SLI ===
NVIDIA nForce 680i SLI System Platform Processors (SPPs) and Media Communications Processors (MCPs) are the top-of-the-line motherboard for Intel users in the nForce 600 series.

- Support for Quad Core CPUs and 1333 MHz Front Side Bus
- Support for 1200 MHz SLI-Ready Memory with EPP
- Support for up to 46 PCI Express (PCIe) lanes
- Support for up to 10 USB 2.0 ports
- Support for 6 3 Gbit/s SATA and 2 PATA drives, which can be linked together in any combination of SATA and PATA to form a RAID 0, 1, 5, or 0+1
- NVIDIA nTune, a tool for easy overclocking and timing configurations
- HDA (Azalia) Audio
- Dual Onboard Gigabit Ethernet
- NVIDIA FirstPacket and DualNet

=== nForce 680i LT SLI ===
- Support for Quad Core CPUs and 1333 MHz Front Side Bus
- Support for 800 MHz SLI-Ready Memory with EPP
- Support for up to 46 PCI Express (PCIe) lanes
- Support for up to 10 USB 2.0 ports
- Support for 6 3 Gbit/s SATA and 2 PATA drives, which can be linked together in any combination of SATA and PATA to form a RAID 0, 1, 5, or 0+1
- NVIDIA nTune, a tool for easy overclocking and timing configurations
- HDA (Azalia) Audio
- Single Onboard Gigabit Ethernet
- NVIDIA FirstPacket and DualNet

=== nForce 650i SLI ===
- Intel LGA 775
- Performance/mainstream dual-GPU segment
- Estimated price US$150 or less

=== nForce 650i Ultra ===
- Intel LGA 775
- Performance/mainstream single-GPU segment
- Estimated price US$150 or less

=== nForce 630i ===
- Intel LGA 775
- IGP
- Single Channel DDR2 SDRAM memory
- Video outputs: HDMI, DVI with HDCP and D-Sub
- Value IGP segment
- No PureVideo

== nForce 680i SLI hotfix ==
NVIDIA has issued a fix named NV121906 in late December 2006 for 680i SLI motherboards. This hotfix was released because users have reported disconnect or write error issues with Serial ATA disk drives on their nForce 680i motherboards. It is an update specifically for SATA Disk Drives and system instability. System instability is observed in the following ways (not a complete list):

- Random application shutdown
- Corrupted boot drive
- BSOD (Blue screen of death)
- Corrupt data

To address them, BIOS updates were released for some NVIDIA nForce 680i SLI based motherboards that eliminate those symptoms. Affected motherboards include:

- EVGA nForce 680i SLI
- BFG nForce 680i SLI
- Biostar TF680i SLI Deluxe
- ECS PN2-SLI2+

This update is supposed to improve system stability and prevent future stability issues related to SATA disk drives on those systems requiring this hotfix. NVIDIA has strongly recommended that all customers upgrade their motherboards to the newest available BIOS revision that their nForce 680i-based motherboards could support, regardless of whether or not they have experienced the issues. Also, NVIDIA has stated that this upgrade will preserve the user's current computer settings.

== See also ==
- Comparison of Nvidia chipsets
