= NForce 700 =

Chipset series by Nvidia

Nvidia nForce 700
- CPU supported: Phenom; Phenom II; Athlon; Athlon II; Core 2 Pentium D
- Socket supported: LGA 775; Socket AM2+

Miscellaneous
- Release date(s): December 2007
- Predecessor: nForce 600
- Successor: nForce 900

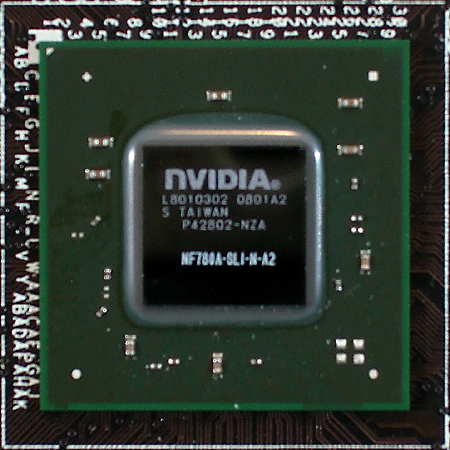
nForce 780a SLI

The nForce 700 is a chipset series designed by Nvidia first released in December 2007. The series supports both Intel Core 2 and AMD Phenom processors, and replaces the nForce 600 series chipsets. Several members were spotted, including the codenamed MCP72 for AMD processors and the C72 for Intel processors, launched with the name "nForce 780a" and "nForce 780i" chipsets respectively. Currently, the released variants are the 750i, 780i, 790i, and 790i Ultra.

== AMD chipsets ==
The memory controller is built-in into the CPU, the supported memory type depends on the CPU and socket used. This way there are no supported memory types listed here.

=== nForce 780a SLI ===
- Codenamed MCP72XE
- Motherboard GPU (mGPU): GeForce 8200
  - DirectX 10 compliant
  - PureVideo HD
- Addition of the nForce 200 PCI-E bridge (previously codenamed BR-04)
  - Connected to the northbridge via a 4.5 GT/s proprietary bus using the PCI-E interface
  - Support for PCI-E 2.0
- Triple SLI
  - Slot 1: full speed PCI Express 2.0 ×16 slot from nForce 200
  - Slot 2: full speed PCI Express 2.0 ×8 slot from nForce 200
  - Slot 3: full speed PCI Express 2.0 ×8 slot from nForce 200
- Hybrid SLI
  - GeForce Boost
  - HybridPower
- Support HT 3.0

=== nForce 750a ===
- Codenamed MCP72P
- Motherboard GPU (mGPU): GeForce 8200
  - DirectX 10 compliant
  - PureVideo HD
- Support for PCI-E 2.0
- SLI
- Hybrid SLI
  - GeForce Boost
  - HybridPower
- Support HT 3.0

=== nForce 725a ===
- Codenamed MCP78U
- Motherboard GPU (mGPU): GeForce 8300
  - DirectX 10 compliant
  - PureVideo HD
  - DTS-HD and Dolby TrueHD 7.1 channel surround sound support (rumored beforehand, not implemented)
- Support for PCI-E 2.0
- Hybrid SLI
  - GeForce Boost
  - HybridPower
- Support HT 3.0

=== nForce 720a ===
- Codenamed MCP78S
- Motherboard GPU (mGPU): GeForce 8200
  - DirectX 10 compliant
  - PureVideo HD
  - DTS-HD and Dolby TrueHD 7.1 channel surround sound support (rumored beforehand, not implemented)
- Support for PCI-E 2.0
- Hybrid SLI
  - GeForce Boost
  - HybridPower
- Support HT 3.0
- Connect up to two display monitors
  - Via DisplayPort, HDMI, DVI or D-Sub

== Intel chipsets ==
=== nForce 7xx ===
The nForce 780i and 750i chipsets features the nForce 200 PCI-E bridge (previously codenamed BR-04) connected to the northbridge via a 4.5 GT/s proprietary bus. Its function is to implement the lack of PCI-E 2.0 support from the northbridge.

	nForce 790i Ultra	nForce 790i	nForce 780i	nForce 750i
Codename	C73XE	C73P	C72XE	C72P
FSB	1600 MHz	1600 MHz	1333 MHz	1333 MHz
Processor Support	45 nm Penryn	45 nm Penryn	45 nm Penryn	45 nm Penryn
RAM Support	DDR3-2000 SLI memory	DDR3-2000 SLI memory	DDR2-1200 SLI memory	DDR2-1200
Maximum RAM	8 GB	8 GB	8 GB	8 GB
SLI	Triple SLI	Triple SLI	Triple SLI	Dual SLI
SLI Slot 1	PCI-E 2.0 ×16 from Northbridge	PCI-E 2.0 ×16 from Northbridge	PCI-E 2.0 ×16 from Northbridge	PCI-E 2.0 ×16 from Northbridge
SLI Slot 2	PCI-E 1.0 ×16 from Southbridge	PCI-E 1.0 ×16 from Southbridge	PCI-E 1.0 ×16 from Southbridge	PCI-E 2.0 ×16 from Northbridge
SLI Slot 3	PCI-E 2.0 ×16 from Northbridge	PCI-E 2.0 ×16 from Northbridge	PCI-E 2.0 ×16 from Northbridge	N/A
Remarks	Memory more easily overclockable	Special GPU routing (PWShort); Overclocks much better than predecessor.	Shared similar layout as its predecessor, the nForce 680i SLI; The northbridge dissipates 48W when running	

=== MCP7A ===
- Three versions:
  - MCP7A-U
  - MCP7A-S
  - MCP7A-H (No IGP and Hybrid SLI)
- motherboard GPU (mGPU)
  - DirectX 10 compliant
  - PureVideo HD
- One PCI-E 2.0 x16 slot
- Hybrid SLI
  - GeForce Boost
  - HybridPower
- Supports a maximum of DDR2-800 dual-channel memory
- Support 1333 MHz FSB
- Connect up to two display monitors
  - Via DisplayPort, HDMI, DVI or D-Sub

== See also ==
- List of Intel chipsets
- Comparison of Nvidia chipsets
