= AMD Ryzen 9 9950X3D =

2025 processor developed by AMD

- The 9950X3D2 variant installed in a CPU socket

General information
- Launched: March 12, 2025
- Product code: Granite Ridge

Performance
- Max. CPU clock rate: 4.3 GHz to 5.7 GHz

Physical specifications
- Cores: 16
- Socket: AM5

Cache
- L3 cache: 128MB (with 3D V-Cache)

Architecture and classification
- Instruction set: Zen 5

History
- Predecessor: Ryzen 9 7950X3D

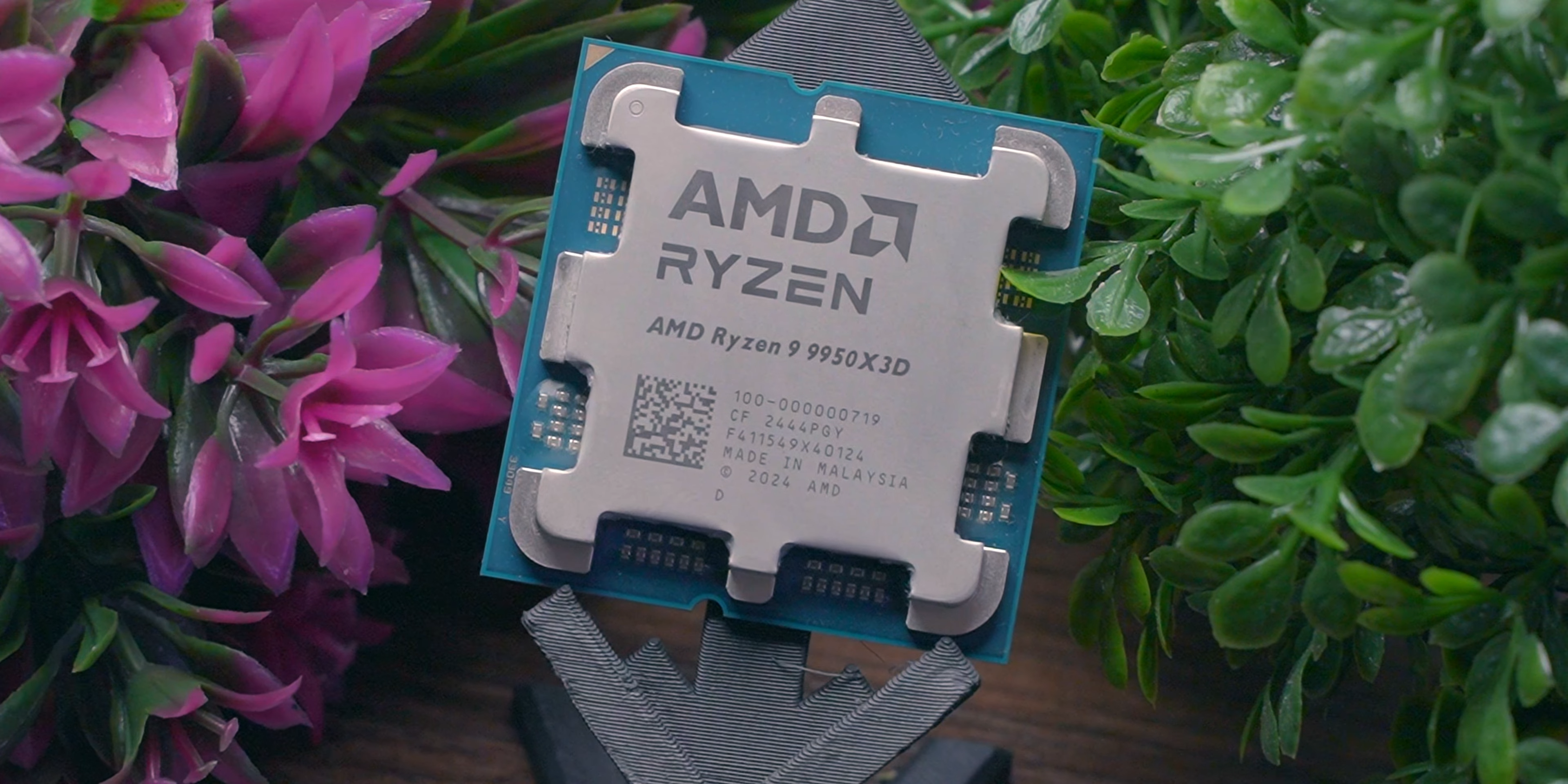
9950X3D

The AMD Ryzen 9 9950X3D is a flagship desktop microprocessor designed by AMD. It was announced in January 2025 at CES and released on 12 March 2025 as part of the Ryzen 9000 series. The processor targets both gaming and content creation workloads and features AMD's second-generation 3D V-Cache technology.

A higher-end variant, the AMD Ryzen 9 9950X3D2, was announced at CES 2026. It was released on April 22, 2026.

== Overview ==
The Ryzen 9 9950X3D is based on the Zen 5 "Granite Ridge" architecture. It incorporates 16 cores and 32 threads, with a base clock frequency of approximately 4.3 GHz and boost speeds reaching up to 5.7 GHz.

One of its two core complex dies (CCDs) includes AMD's stacked 3D V-Cache, resulting in a total of around 128 MB of L3 cache and for a total of 145 MB of CPU cache. The processor has a default thermal design power (TDP) of 170 W, with a maximum consumption of 230 W. It is compatible with the AM5 socket platform, supporting DDR5 memory up to 256 GB in size.

== Design and innovations ==
The 9950X3D introduces AMD's second-generation 3D V-Cache implementation, which repositions the cache die to below one of the core complex dies (CCD) to improve thermal characteristics compared with earlier models. This design allows higher sustained boost clocks under load. Earlier Ryzen generations using 3D V-Cache positioned the extra cache die on top of a CCD which limited the maximum core clocks due to cooling restrictions.

The asymmetric cache distribution—where only one CCD carries the additional stacked cache—offers a balance between cache-sensitive gaming workloads and multi-threaded productivity applications.

== Performance ==
AMD markets the Ryzen 9 9950X3D as a processor suitable for both gamers and creators. In gaming benchmarks, it delivers performance comparable to the Ryzen 7 9800X3D, while its higher core count provides a notable advantage in content creation tasks such as video editing and 3D rendering.

== Reception ==
At launch, AMD described the Ryzen 9 9950X3D as "the world's best processor for gamers and creators." With a launch price of US$699, it is positioned above Intel's consumer flagship of the same generation, the Core Ultra 9 285K. Reviewers highlighted its strong balance of gaming and productivity performance, though noted that its advantage in gaming over less expensive X3D models was modest.

ComputerBase found that "In testing, the AMD Ryzen 9 9950X3D combines the best of both worlds: the highest application performance with a top ranking in gaming." However, they criticized the CPU's relatively high power consumption in gaming compared to the Ryzen 7 9800X3D.

According to the German magazine PC Games Hardware, the 9950X3D "is currently the best CPU on the market in terms of overall performance", beating both Intel's Core Ultra 9 285K and Intel's previous-generation flagship Core i9-14900K(S). They noted, however, that users who do not need high productivity performance "should still opt for the Ryzen 7 9800X3D. Not only is it slightly faster in games and significantly cheaper to purchase, but thanks to only one CCD, it also avoids the problems associated with faulty scheduling."

PCMag praised the CPU for its performance, especially in gaming, and found its high price justified, but noted that its performance in workloads is "Not much faster" than the Ryzen 9 9950X.

Heise Online stated that, until the release of the 9950X3D, power users had the choice between the 9950X for maximum multithreading performance and the 9800X3D for maximum gaming performance, while "The Ryzen 9 9950X3D now combines both worlds."

In Golem's benchmarks, the 9950X3D was "almost always the fastest gaming CPU, even ahead of the specialized AMD Ryzen 7 9800X3D".

IGN praised the CPU's "surprisingly good value, given what you are getting", calling it "the obvious choice unless you have specific workloads that are accelerated by Intel CPUs", noting that "Intel's CPUs have more cores, so they tend to perform better in heavily multi-threaded workloads".

== Limitations ==
The processor's high power consumption and thermal output require robust cooling solutions and high-quality motherboards with strong power delivery. For users focused exclusively on gaming, lower-cost X3D models may provide comparable frame rates at a reduced price.
