= Epyc =

AMD brand of server microprocessors

General information
- Launched: June 20, 2017; 9 years ago
- Marketed by: AMD
- Designed by: AMD
- Common manufacturers: GlobalFoundries (14 nm and 12 nm); TSMC (7 nm and beyond)

Performance
- Max. CPU clock rate: 2.7 GHz to 5.7 GHz

Physical specifications
- Cores: up to 256 cores/512 threads per socket
- Memory (RAM): up to 16 memory channels (DDR5) / 24 channels (LPDDR5X)
- Socket: AM5 SP3 SP5 SP6 SP7 SP8

Architecture and classification
- Technology node: 14 nm to 2 nm
- Microarchitecture: Zen microarchitecture: Zen; Zen 2; Zen 3; Zen 4; Zen 4c; Zen 5; Zen 5c; Zen 6; Zen 6c
- Instruction set: AMD64 (x86-64)
- Extensions: MMX(+), SSE1, SSE2, SSE3, SSSE3, SSE4a, SSE4.1, SSE4.2, AVX, AVX2, AVX-512 (with Zen 4 and later), FMA3, CVT16/F16C, ABM, BMI1, BMI2, AES, CLMUL, RDRAND, SHA, SME, AMD-V, AMD-Vi

Products, models, variants
- Core names: Naples; Rome; Milan; Genoa; Bergamo; Siena; Raphael; Turin

History
- Predecessor: Opteron

Epyc (stylized as EPYC) is a brand of multi-core x86-64 microprocessors designed and sold by AMD, based on the company's Zen microarchitecture. Introduced in June 2017, they are specifically targeted for the server and embedded system markets.

Epyc processors share the same microarchitecture as their regular desktop-grade counterparts, but have enterprise-grade features such as higher core counts, more PCI Express lanes, support for larger amounts of RAM and more memory channels, support for ECC memory, and larger CPU cache. They also support multi-chip and dual-socket system configurations by using the Infinity Fabric interconnect.

== History ==
In March 2017, AMD announced plans to re-enter the server market with a platform based on the Zen microarchitecture, codenamed Naples, and officially revealed it under the brand name Epyc in May. That June AMD officially launched Epyc 7001 series processors, offering up to 32 cores per socket, and enabling performance that allowed Epyc to be competitive with the competing Intel Xeon Scalable product line. In August 2019, the Epyc 7002 "Rome" series processors, based on the Zen 2 microarchitecture, launched, doubling the core count per socket to 64, and increasing per-core performance dramatically over the last generation architecture.

In March 2021, AMD launched the Epyc 7003 "Milan" series, based on the Zen 3 microarchitecture. Epyc Milan brought the same 64 cores as Epyc Rome, but with much higher per-core performance, with the Epyc 7763 beating the Epyc 7702 by up to 22 percent despite having the same number of cores and threads. A refresh of the Epyc 7003 "Milan" series with 3D V-Cache, named Milan-X, launched on March 21, 2022, using the same cores as Milan, but with an additional 512 MB of cache stacked onto the compute dies, bringing the total amount of cache per CPU to 768 MB.

In September 2021, Oak Ridge National Laboratory partnered with AMD and HPE Cray to build Frontier, a supercomputer with 9,472 Epyc 7453 CPUs and 37,888 Instinct MI250X GPUs, becoming operational by May 2022. As of November 2023, it is the most powerful supercomputer in the world according to the TOP500, with a peak performance of over 1.6 exaFLOPS.

In November 2021, AMD detailed the upcoming generations of Epyc, and unveiled the new LGA-6096 SP5 socket that would support the new generations of Epyc chips. Codenamed Genoa, these CPUs are based on the Zen 4 microarchitecture and built on TSMC's N5 node, supporting up to 96 cores and 192 threads per socket, alongside 12 channels of DDR5 and 128 PCIe 5.0 lanes. Genoa also became the first x86 server CPU to support Compute Express Link 1.1, or CXL, allowing for further expansion of memory and other devices with a high bandwidth interface built on PCIe 5.0. AMD also shared information regarding the sister chip of Genoa, codenamed Bergamo. Bergamo is based on a modified version of Zen 4 named Zen 4c, designed to allow for much higher core counts and efficiency at the cost of lower single-core performance, targeting cloud providers and workloads, compared to traditional high performance computing workloads. It is compatible with Socket SP5, and supports up to 128 cores and 256 threads per socket.

In November 2022, AMD launched their 4th generation Epyc "Genoa" series of CPUs. Some tech reviewers and customers had already received hardware for testing and benchmarking, and third party benchmarks of Genoa parts were immediately available. The flagship part, the 96 core Epyc 9654, set records for multi-core performance, and showed up to 4× performance compared to Intel's flagship part, the Xeon Platinum 8380. High memory bandwidth and extensive PCIe connectivity removed many bottlenecks, allowing all 96 cores to be utilized in workloads where previous generation Milan chips would have been I/O-bound.

In June 2023, AMD began shipping the 3D V-Cache enabled Genoa-X lineup, a variant of Genoa that uses the same 3D die stacking technology as Milan-X to enable up to 1152 MB of L3 cache, a 50% increase over Milan-X, which had a maximum of 768 MB of L3 cache. On the same day, AMD also announced the release of their cloud optimized Zen 4c SKUs, codenamed Bergamo, offering up to 128 cores per socket, utilizing a modified version of the Zen 4 core that was optimized for power efficiency and to reduce die space. Zen 4c cores do not have any instructions removed compared to standard Zen 4 cores; instead, the amount of L3 cache per CCX is reduced from 32 to 16 MB, and the frequency of the cores is reduced. Bergamo is socket compatible with Genoa, using the same SP5 socket and supporting the same CXL, PCIe, and DDR5 capacity as Genoa.

In September 2023, AMD launched their low power and embedded 8004 series of CPUs, codenamed Siena. Siena utilizes a new socket, called SP6, which has a smaller footprint and pin count than the SP5 socket of its contemporary Genoa processors. Siena utilizes the same Zen 4c core architecture as Bergamo cloud native processors, allowing up to 64 cores per processor, and the same 6 nm I/O die as Bergamo and Genoa, although certain features have been cut down, such as reducing the memory support from 12 channels of DDR5 to only 6, and removing dual socket support.

In May 2024, AMD launched the new 4004 series of CPUs, codenamed Raphael. Sharing the same AM5 socket as desktop Ryzen CPUs. In contrast to desktop parts ECC memories are supported. AM5 motherboard manufacturers do not support the 4004 so available options are very limited to devices which are not suitable for desktop use.

On October 10, 2024, AMD launched the new 9005 series of CPUs, codenamed Turin. Sharing the same SP5 socket as Genoa and Bergamo, Turin came with numerous platform advancements, including the support for up to 6400 MT/s DDR5 memory. Turin also increased the core count and frequency offerings, with Turin offering 128 Zen 5 cores per socket, and Turin Dense offering 192 Zen 5c cores per socket. And with the highest frequency SKU (The EPYC 9575F) having a operating frequency of up to 5 GHz.

On July 23, 2026, AMD launched the sixth generation Epyc 9006 series, codenamed Venice, at its Advancing AI event. Built on TSMC's N2 node, Venice is the first Zen 6 product line and the first high-performance x86 CPU manufactured on a 2 nm-class process. The 9006 series spans 8 to 256 cores per socket on the new SP7 socket, with the 256-core models using dense Zen 6c cores and high-frequency variants offering up to 96 Zen 6 cores at up to 5 GHz. The platform supports 16 channels of DDR5 (up to 8 GT/s RDIMM or 12.8 GT/s MRDIMM), 128 lanes of PCIe 6.0, and CXL 3.1, with TDPs up to 600 W. A 3D V-Cache variant (9006X) provides up to 1152 MB of L3 cache and clock speeds up to 5.15 GHz, while a smaller SP8 platform with 8 to 128 cores succeeds the 8004 series for edge and power-constrained deployments. A low-power variant, the Epyc 9006 LP (codenamed Verano), targets AI host-node duty with up to 24 channels of LPDDR5X memory on replaceable SOCAMM2 modules. AMD claimed up to a 70% performance increase over the previous generation.

AMD Epyc CPU codenames follow the naming scheme of Italian cities, including Milan, Rome, Naples, Genoa, Bergamo, Siena, Turin, Venice, and Verano.

=== CPU generations ===
AMD Epyc CPU generations
Gen	Year	Codename	Product line	Cores	Socket	Memory
Server
1st	2017	Naples	7001 series	32 × Zen	SP3 (LGA)	DDR4
2nd	2019	Rome	7002 series	64 × Zen 2	SP3 (LGA)	DDR4
3rd	2021	Milan	7003 series	64 × Zen 3	SP3 (LGA)	DDR4
3rd	2022	Milan-X	7003 series	64 × Zen 3	SP3 (LGA)	DDR4
4th	2022	Genoa	9004 series	96 × Zen 4	SP5 (LGA)	DDR5
4th	2023	Genoa-X	9004 series	96 × Zen 4	SP5 (LGA)	DDR5
4th	2023	Bergamo	9004 series	128 × Zen 4c	SP5 (LGA)	DDR5
4th	2023	Siena	8004 series	64 × Zen 4c	SP6 (LGA)	DDR5
4th	2024	Raphael	4004 series	16 × Zen 4	AM5 (LGA)	DDR5
5th	2024	Turin	9005 series	128 × Zen 5	SP5 (LGA)	DDR5
5th	2024	Turin Dense	9005 series	192 × Zen 5c	SP5 (LGA)	DDR5
5th	2025	Grado	4005 series	16 × Zen 5	AM5 (LGA)	DDR5
5th	2026	Sorano	8005 series	84 × Zen 5	SP6 (LGA)	DDR5
6th	2026	Venice	9006 series	96 × Zen 6	SP7 (LGA); SP8 (LGA)	DDR5
6th	2026	Venice Dense	9006 series	256 × Zen 6c	SP7 (LGA); SP8 (LGA)	DDR5
6th	2027	Verano	9006 LP series	72 × Zen 6	?	LPDDR5X
Embedded
1st	2018	Snowy Owl	Embedded 3001 series	16 × Zen	SP4 (BGA)	DDR4
1st	2019	Naples	Embedded 7001 series	32 × Zen	SP3 (BGA)	DDR4
2nd	2021	Rome	Embedded 7002 series	64 × Zen 2	SP3 (BGA)	DDR4
3rd	2022	Milan	Embedded 7003 series	64 × Zen 3	SP3 (BGA)	DDR4
4th	2023	Genoa	Embedded 9004 series	96 × Zen 4	SP5 (BGA)	DDR5
4th	2023	Siena	Embedded 8004 series	64 × Zen 4c	SP6 (BGA)	DDR5
5th	2025	Turin	Embedded 9005 series	128 × Zen 5	SP5 (BGA)	DDR5
5th	2025	Turin Dense	Embedded 9005 series	192 × Zen 5c	SP5 (BGA)	DDR5
5th	2025	Grado	Embedded 4005 series	16 × Zen 5	AM5 (LGA)	DDR5
5th	2026	Fire Range	Embedded 2005 series	16 × Zen 5	FL1 (BGA)	DDR5

== Design ==
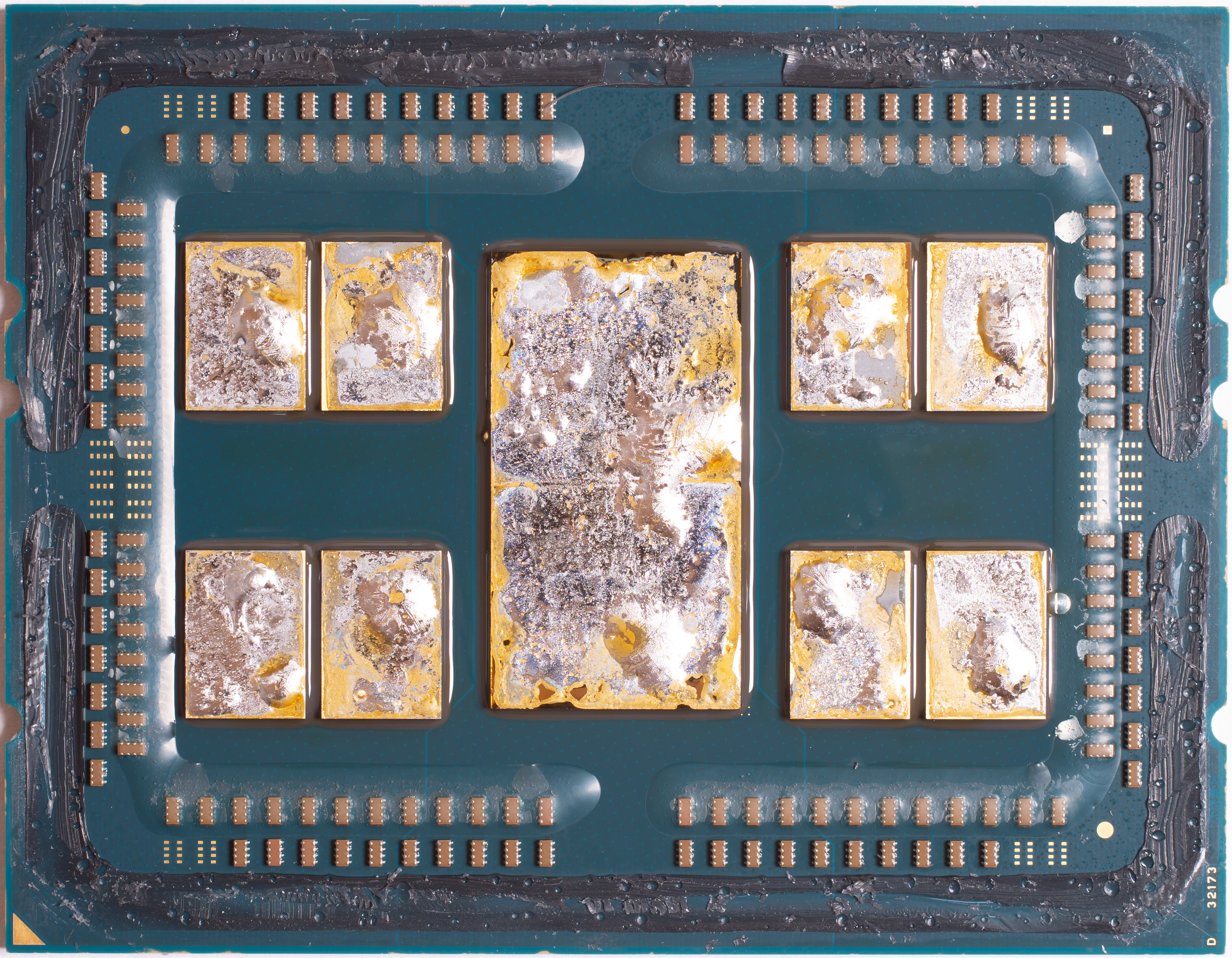
A delidded second gen Epyc 7702, showing the die configuration

Epyc CPUs use a multi-chip module design to enable higher yields for a CPU than traditional monolithic dies. First generation Epyc CPUs are composed of four 14 nm compute dies, each with up to 8 cores. Cores are symmetrically disabled on dies to create lower binned products with fewer cores but the same I/O and memory footprint. Second and Third gen Epyc CPUs are composed of eight compute dies built on a 7 nm process node, and a large input/output (I/O) die built on a 14 nm process node. Third gen Milan-X CPUs use advanced through-silicon-vias to stack an additional die on top of each of the 8 compute dies, adding 64 MB of L3 cache per die.

Epyc CPUs supports both single socket and dual socket operation. In a dual socket configuration, 64 PCIe lanes from each CPU are allocated to AMD's proprietary Infinity Fabric interconnect to allow for full bandwidth between both CPUs. Thus, a dual socket configuration has the same number of usable PCIe lanes as a single socket configuration. First generation Epyc CPUs had 128 PCIe 3.0 lanes, while second and third generation had 128 PCIe 4.0 lanes. All current Epyc CPUs are equipped with up to eight channels of DDR4 at varying speeds, though next gen Genoa CPUs are confirmed by AMD to support up to twelve channels of DDR5.

Unlike Opteron, Intel equivalents and AMD's desktop processors (excluding Socket AM1), Epyc processors are chipset-free - also known as system on a chip. That means most features required to make servers fully functional (such as memory, PCI Express, SATA controllers, etc.) are fully integrated into the processor, eliminating the need for a chipset to be placed on the mainboard. Some features may require the use of additional controller chips to utilize.

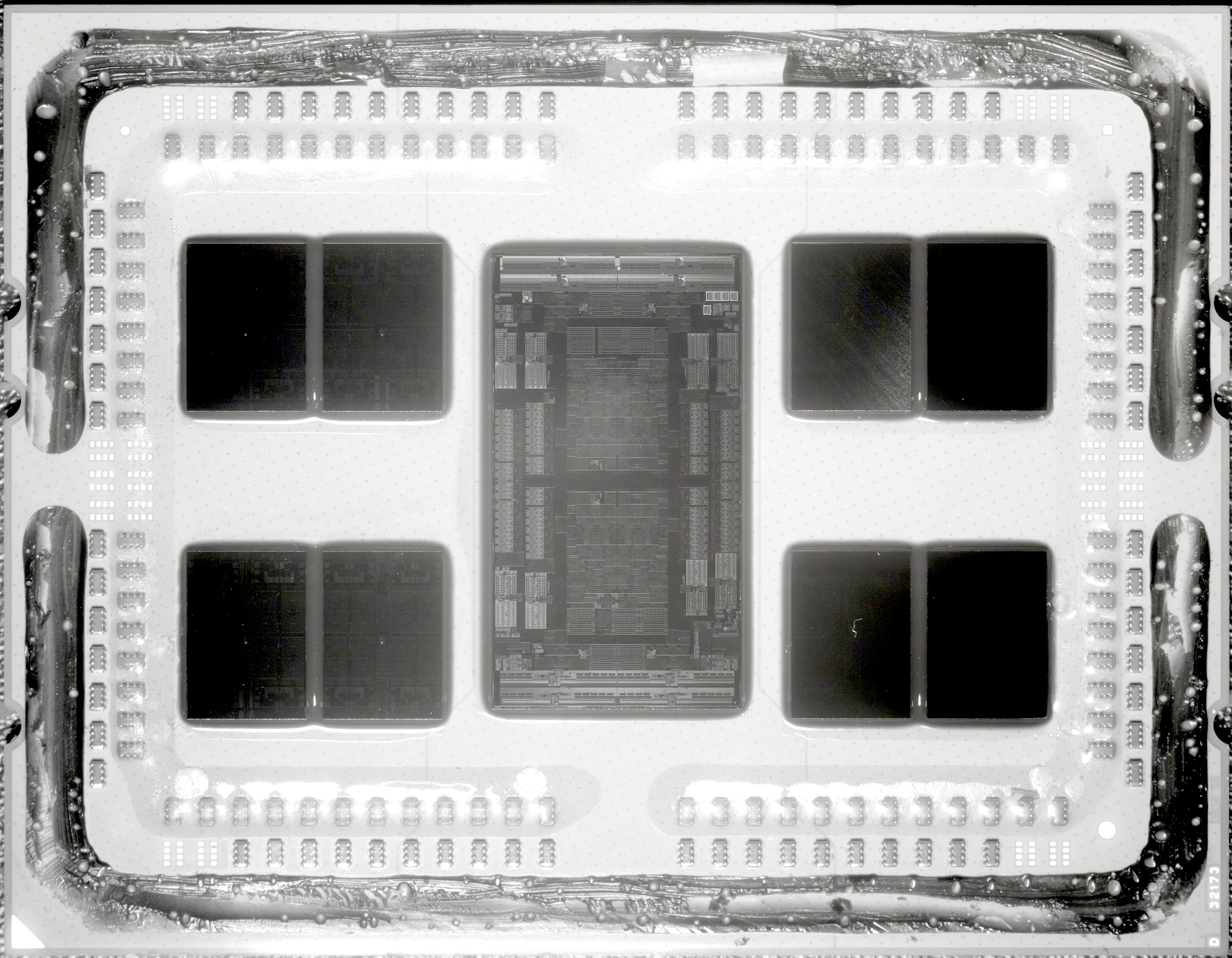
A near-infrared photograph of a delidded second gen Epyc 7702. Each CCD has two CCXs.

== Reception ==
Initial reception to Epyc was generally positive. Epyc was generally found to outperform Intel CPUs in cases where the cores could work independently, such as in high-performance computing and big-data applications. First generation Epyc fell behind in database tasks compared to Intel's Xeon parts due to higher cache latency. In 2021 Meta Platforms selected Epyc chips for its metaverse data centers.

Epyc Genoa was well received, as it offered improved performance and efficiency compared to previous offerings, though received some criticism for not having 2 DIMMs per channel configurations validating, with some reviewers calling it an "incomplete platform".

== List of Epyc processors ==
=== Server ===
==== First generation Epyc (Naples) ====
The first generation was composed of only the 7001 series SKUs, all using the same multi-chip module (MCM) topology with four Zeppelin dies interconnected on the MCM. Each SOC die contributes its two DDR4 memory channels, 32 external PCIe 3.0 lanes, two 4-core core complexes and associated I/O interfaces like 4 SATA ports or several USB ports.

===== EPYC 7001 series =====
Common features:

- SP3 socket
- Zen microarchitecture
- GloFo 14 nm process
- MCM with four System-on-a-chip (SOC) dies, two core complexes (CCX) per SOC die
- Eight-channel DDR4-2666 (the 7251 model is limited to DDR4-2400)
- 128 PCIe 3.0 lanes per socket, 64 of which are used for Infinity Fabric inter-processor links in 2P platforms
- 7xx1P series models are limited to uniprocessor operation (1P, single-socket)

Model	Cores (threads)	Chip- lets	Core config (Note: Core Complexes (CCX) × cores per CCX)	Clock rate		Cache size			Soc- ket	Sca- ling	TDP (W)	Release date	Release price	Embedded options (Note: Epyc Embedded 7001 series models have identical specifications as the respective Epyc 7001 series.)
Model	Cores (threads)	Chip- lets	Core config	Base (GHz)	Boost (GHz)	L2 per core	L3 per CCX	Total	Soc- ket	Sca- ling	TDP (W)	Release date	Release price	Embedded options
7251	8 (16)	4	8 × 1	2.1	2.9	512 KB	4 MB	36 MB	SP3	2P	120	Jun 2017	$475	7251
7261	8 (16)	4	8 × 1	2.5	2.9	512 KB	8 MB	68 MB	SP3	2P	155/170	Jun 2018	$570	7261
7281	16 (32)	4	8 × 2	2.1	2.7	512 KB	4 MB	40 MB	SP3	2P	155/170	Jun 2017	$650	7281
7301	16 (32)	4	8 × 2	2.2	2.7	512 KB	8 MB	72 MB	SP3	2P	155/170	Jun 2017	$800	7301
7351(P)	16 (32)	4	8 × 2	2.4	2.9	512 KB	8 MB	72 MB	SP3	2P (1P)	155/170	Jun 2017	$1100 ($750)	7351(735P)
7371	16 (32)	4	8 × 2	3.1	3.8	512 KB	8 MB	72 MB	SP3	2P	200	Nov 2018	$1550	7371
7401(P)	24 (48)	4	8 × 3	2.0	3.0	512 KB	8 MB	76 MB	SP3	2P (1P)	155/170	Jun 2017	$1850 ($1075)	7401(740P)
7451	24 (48)	4	8 × 3	2.3	3.2	512 KB	8 MB	76 MB	SP3	2P	180	Jun 2017	$2400	7451
7501	32 (64)	4	8 × 4	2.0	3.0	512 KB	8 MB	80 MB	SP3	2P	155/170	Jun 2017	$3400	7501
7551(P)	32 (64)	4	8 × 4	2.0	3.0	512 KB	8 MB	80 MB	SP3	2P (1P)	180	Jun 2017	$3400 ($2100)	7551(755P)
7571	32 (64)	4	8 × 4	2.2	3.0	512 KB	8 MB	80 MB	SP3	2P	200	Nov 2018	OEM/AWS	--
7601	32 (64)	4	8 × 4	2.2	3.2	512 KB	8 MB	80 MB	SP3	2P	180	Jun 2017	$4200	7601

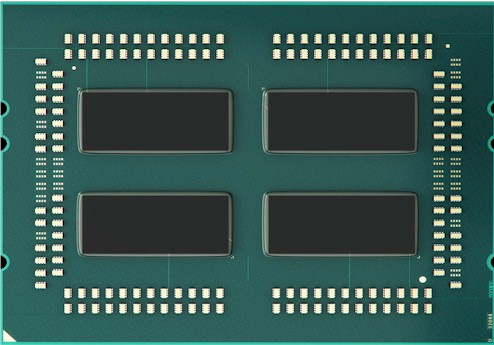
A Epyc 7001 die configuration

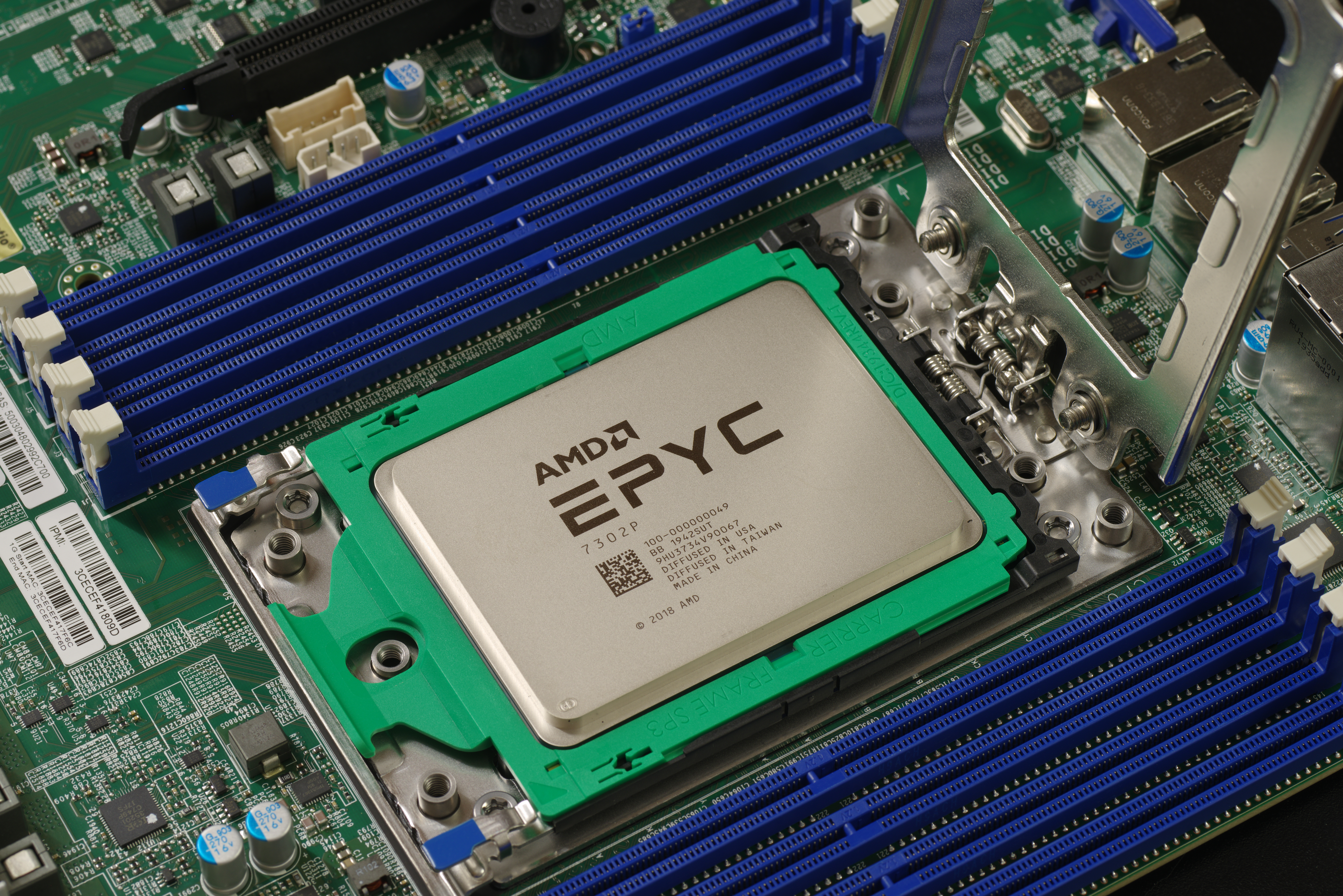
A second generation Epyc CPU in an SP3 socket

==== Second generation Epyc (Rome) ====
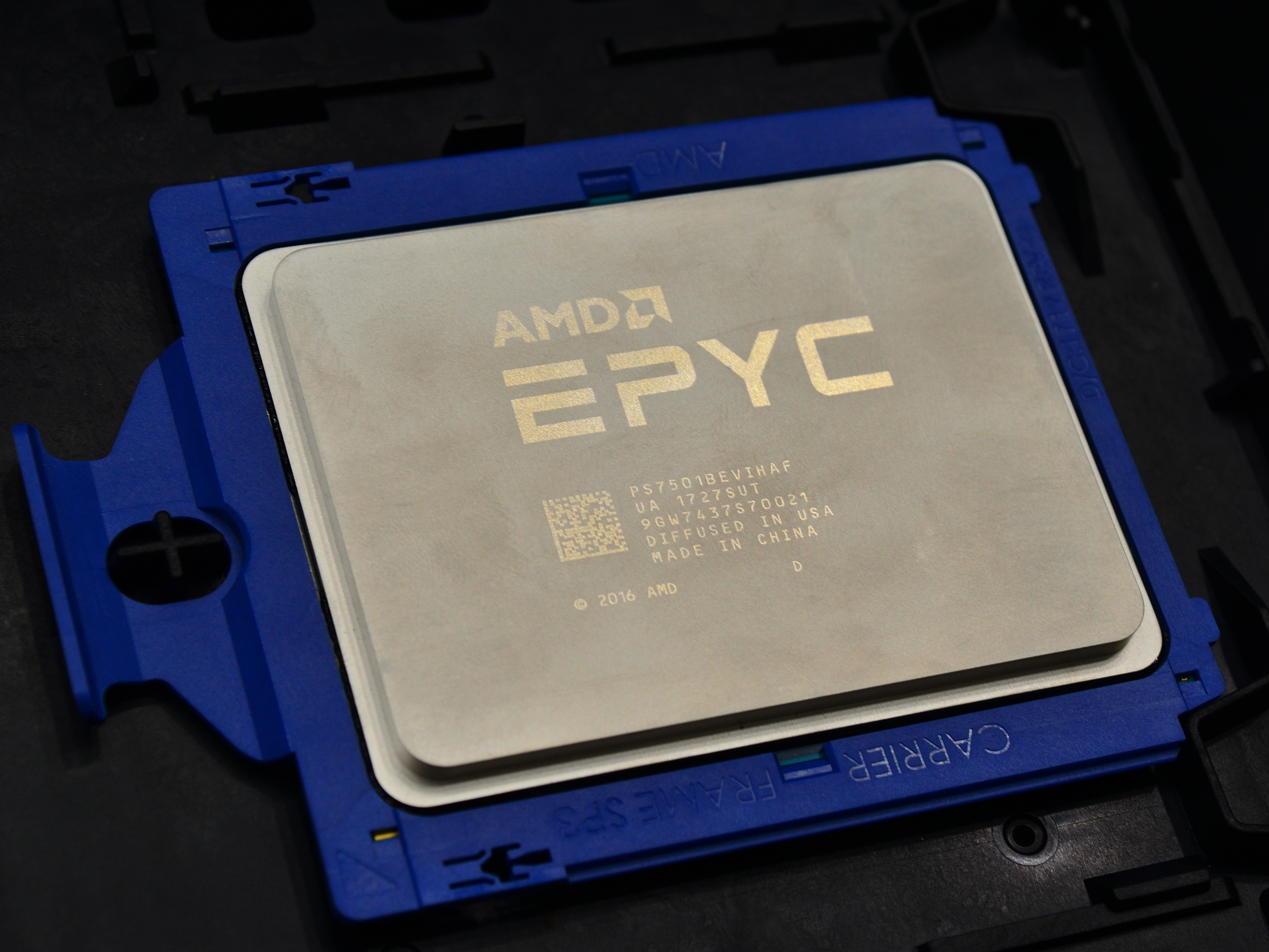
First generation Epyc processor

In November 2018, AMD announced Epyc 2 at their Next Horizon event, the second generation of Epyc processors codenamed "Rome" and based on the Zen 2 microarchitecture. The processors feature up to eight 7 nm-based "chiplet" processors with a 14 nm-based IO chip providing 128 PCIe 4.0 lanes in the center interconnected via Infinity Fabric. The processors support up to 8 channels of DDR4 RAM up to 4 TB, and introduce support for PCIe 4.0. These processors have up to 64 cores with 128 SMT threads per socket. The 7 nm "Rome" is manufactured by TSMC. It was released on August 7, 2019. It has 39.5 billion transistors.

In April 2020, AMD launched three new SKUs using Epyc's 7nm Rome platform. The three processors introduced were the eight-core Epyc 7F32, the 16-core 7F52 and the 24-core 7F72, featuring base clocks up to 3.7 GHz (up to 3.9 GHz with boost) within a TDP range of 180 to 240 watts. The launch was supported by Dell EMC, Hewlett Packard Enterprise, Lenovo, Supermicro, and Nutanix.

===== EPYC 7002 series =====
Common features:

- SP3 socket
- Zen 2 microarchitecture
- TSMC 7 nm process for the compute dies, GloFo 14 nm process for the I/O die
- MCM with one I/O Die (IOD) and multiple Core Complex Dies (CCD) for compute, two core complexes (CCX) per CCD chiplet
- Eight-channel DDR4-3200
- 128 PCIe 4.0 lanes per socket, 64 of which are used for Infinity Fabric inter-processor links in 2P platforms
- 7002P series models are limited to uniprocessor operation (1P, single-socket)

Model	Cores (threads)	Chiplets	Core config (Note: Core Complexes (CCX) × cores per CCX)	Clock rate		Cache			Socket	Scaling	TDP	Release date	Release price
Model	Cores (threads)	Chiplets	Core config	Base (GHz)	Boost (GHz)	L2 per core	L3 per CCX	Total	Socket	Scaling	TDP	Release date	Release price
7232P	8 (16)	2 + IOD	4 × 2	3.1	3.2	512 KB	8 MB	36 MB	SP3	1P	120 W	Aug 7, 2019	$450
7252	8 (16)	2 + IOD	4 × 2	3.1	3.2	512 KB	16 MB	68 MB	SP3	2P	120 W	Aug 7, 2019	$475
7262	8 (16)	4 + IOD	8 × 1	3.2	3.4	512 KB	16 MB	132 MB	SP3	2P	155 W	Aug 7, 2019	$575
7F32	8 (16)	4 + IOD	8 × 1	3.7	3.9	512 KB	16 MB	132 MB	SP3	2P	180 W	Apr 14, 2020	$2100
7272	12 (24)	2 + IOD	4 × 3	2.9	3.2	512 KB	16 MB	70 MB	SP3	2P	120 W	Aug 7, 2019	$625
7282	16 (32)	2 + IOD	4 × 4	2.8	3.2	512 KB	16 MB	72 MB	SP3	2P	120 W	Aug 7, 2019	$650
7302(P)	16 (32)	4 + IOD	8 × 2	3.0	3.3	512 KB	16 MB	136 MB	SP3	2P (1P)	155 W	Aug 7, 2019	$978 ($825)
7F52	16 (32)	8 + IOD	16 × 1	3.5	3.9	512 KB	16 MB	264 MB	SP3	2P	240 W	Apr 14, 2020	$3100
7352	24 (48)	4 + IOD	8 × 3	2.3	3.2	512 KB	16 MB	140 MB	SP3	2P	155 W	Aug 7, 2019	$1350
7402(P)	24 (48)	4 + IOD	8 × 3	2.8	3.35	512 KB	16 MB	140 MB	SP3	2P (1P)	180 W	Aug 7, 2019	$1783 ($1250)
7F72	24 (48)	6 + IOD	12 × 2	3.2	3.7	512 KB	16 MB	204 MB	SP3	2P	240 W	Apr 14, 2020	$2450
7452	32 (64)	4 + IOD	8 × 4	2.35	3.35	512 KB	16 MB	144 MB	SP3	2P	155 W	Aug 7, 2019	$2025
7502(P)	32 (64)	4 + IOD	8 × 4	2.5	3.35	512 KB	16 MB	144 MB	SP3	2P (1P)	180 W	Aug 7, 2019	$2600 ($2300)
7542	32 (64)	4 + IOD	8 × 4	2.9	3.4	512 KB	16 MB	144 MB	SP3	2P	225 W	Aug 7, 2019	$3400
7532	32 (64)	8 + IOD	16 × 2	2.4	3.3	512 KB	16 MB	272 MB	SP3	2P	200 W	Aug 7, 2019	$3350
7552	48 (96)	6 + IOD	12 × 4	2.2	3.3	512 KB	16 MB	216 MB	SP3	2P	200 W	Aug 7, 2019	$4025
7642	48 (96)	8 + IOD	16 × 3	2.3	3.3	512 KB	16 MB	280 MB	SP3	2P	225 W	Aug 7, 2019	$4775
7662	64 (128)	8 + IOD	16 × 4	2.0	3.3	512 KB	16 MB	288 MB	SP3	2P	225 W	Aug 7, 2019	$6150
7702(P)	64 (128)	8 + IOD	16 × 4	2.0	3.35	512 KB	16 MB	288 MB	SP3	2P (1P)	200 W	Aug 7, 2019	$6450 ($4425)
7742	64 (128)	8 + IOD	16 × 4	2.25	3.4	512 KB	16 MB	288 MB	SP3	2P	225 W	Aug 7, 2019	$6950
7H12	64 (128)	8 + IOD	16 × 4	2.6	3.3	512 KB	16 MB	288 MB	SP3	2P	280 W	Sep 18, 2019	---

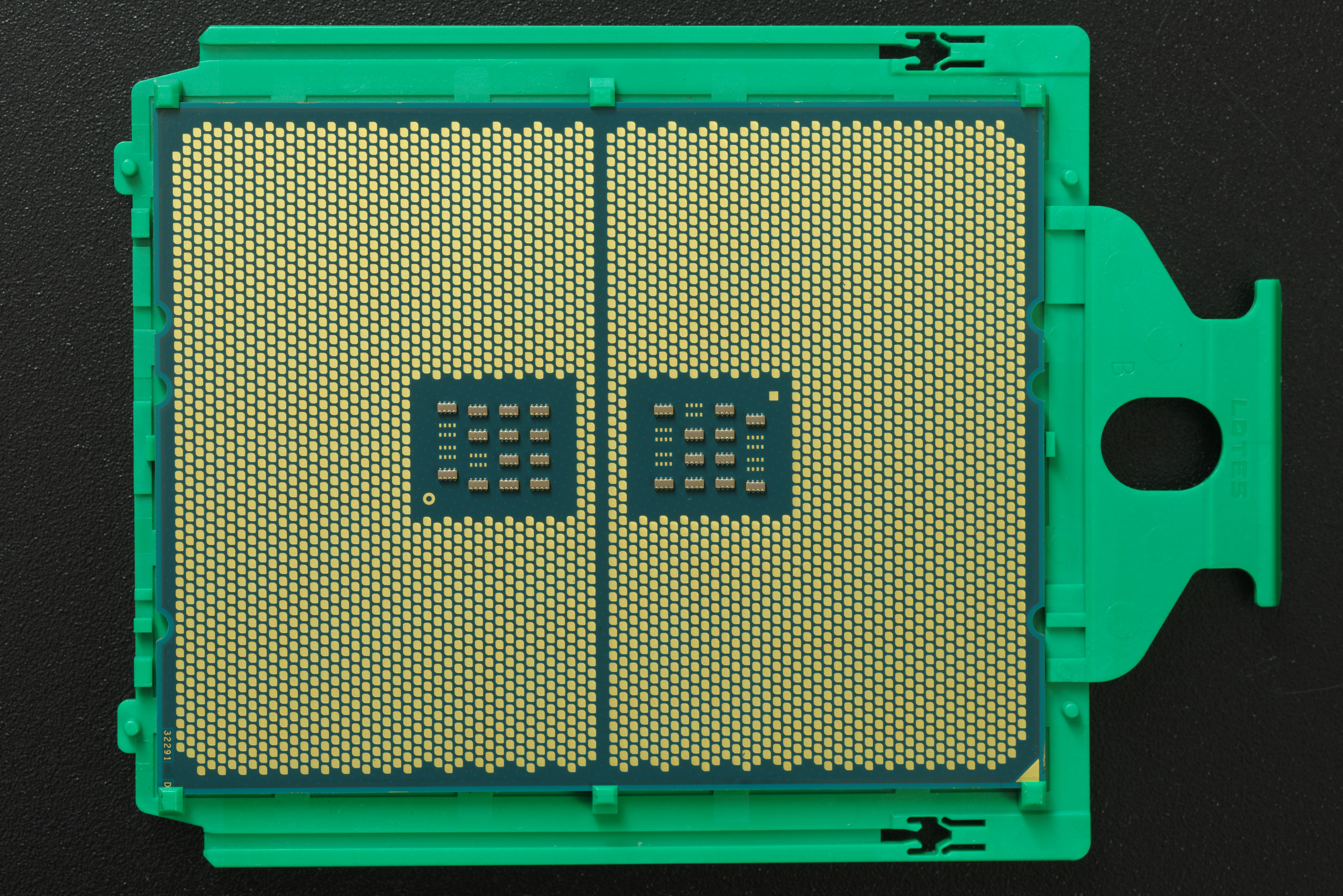
The bottom side of an Epyc 7302 mounted in a plastic carrier

==== Third generation Epyc (Milan) ====
At the HPC-AI Advisory Council in the United Kingdom in October 2019, AMD stated specifications for Milan, Epyc chips based on the Zen 3 microarchitecture. Milan chips will use Socket SP3, with up to 64 cores on package, and support eight-channel DDR4 RAM and 128 PCIe 4.0 lanes. It also announced plans for the subsequent generation of chips, codenamed Genoa, that will be based on the Zen 4 microarchitecture and use Socket SP5.

Milan CPUs were launched by AMD on March 15, 2021.

Milan-X CPUs were launched March 21, 2022. They use 3D V-Cache technology to increase the maximum L3 cache per socket capacity from 256 MB to 768 MB.

===== EPYC 7003 series =====
Common features:

- SP3 socket
- Zen 3 microarchitecture
- TSMC 7 nm process for the compute and cache dies, GloFo 14 nm process for the I/O die
- MCM with one I/O Die (IOD) and multiple Core Complex Dies (CCD) for compute, one core complex (CCX) per CCD chiplet
- Eight-channel DDR4-3200
- 128 PCIe 4.0 lanes per socket, 64 of which are used for Infinity Fabric inter-processor links in 2P platforms
- 7003X series models include 64 MiB L3 cache dies stacked on top of the compute dies (3D V-Cache)
- 7003P series models are limited to uniprocessor operation (1P, single-socket)

Model	Cores (threads)	Chiplets	Core config (Note: Core Complexes (CCX) × cores per CCX)	Clock rate		Cache size			Socket	Scaling	TDP default (range)	Release price
Model	Cores (threads)	Chiplets	Core config	Base (GHz)	Boost (GHz)	L2 per core	L3 per CCX	Total	Socket	Scaling	TDP default (range)	Release price
7203(P)	8 (16)	2 + IOD	2 × 4	2.8	3.4	512 KB	32 MB	68 MB	SP3	2P (1P)	120 W (120-150)	$348 ($338)
72F3	8 (16)	8 + IOD	8 × 1	3.7	4.1	512 KB	32 MB	260 MB	SP3	2P	180 W (165-200)	$2468
7303(P)	16 (32)	2 + IOD	2 × 8	2.4	3.4	512 KB	32 MB	72 MB	SP3	2P (1P)	130 W (120-150)	$604 ($594)
7313(P)	16 (32)	4 + IOD	4 × 4	3.0	3.7	512 KB	32 MB	136 MB	SP3	2P (1P)	155 W (155-180)	$1083 ($913)
7343	16 (32)	4 + IOD	4 × 4	3.2	3.9	512 KB	32 MB	136 MB	SP3	2P	190 W (165-200)	$1565
73F3	16 (32)	8 + IOD	8 × 2	3.5	4.0	512 KB	32 MB	264 MB	SP3	2P	240 W (225-240)	$3521
7373X	16 (32)	8* + IOD	8 × 2	3.05	3.8	512 KB	96 MB	776 MB	SP3	2P	240 W (225-280)	$4185
7413	24 (48)	4 + IOD	4 × 6	2.65	3.6	512 KB	32 MB	140 MB	SP3	2P	180 W (165-200)	$1825
7443(P)	24 (48)	4 + IOD	4 × 6	2.85	4.0	512 KB	32 MB	140 MB	SP3	2P (1P)	200 W (165-200)	$2010 ($1337)
74F3	24 (48)	8 + IOD	8 × 3	3.2	4.0	512 KB	32 MB	268 MB	SP3	2P	240 W (225-240)	$2900
7473X	24 (48)	8* + IOD	8 × 3	2.8	3.7	512 KB	96 MB	780 MB	SP3	2P	240 W (225-280)	$3900
7453	28 (56)	4 + IOD	4 × 7	2.75	3.45	512 KB	16 MB	78 MB	SP3	2P	225 W (225-240)	$1570
7513	32 (64)	4 + IOD	4 × 8	2.6	3.65	512 KB	32 MB	144 MB	SP3	2P	200 W (165-200)	$2840
7543(P)	32 (64)	8 + IOD	8 × 4	2.8	3.7	512 KB	32 MB	272 MB	SP3	2P (1P)	225 W (225-240)	$3761 ($2730)
75F3	32 (64)	8 + IOD	8 × 4	2.95	4.0	512 KB	32 MB	272 MB	SP3	2P	280 W (225-280)	$4860
7573X	32 (64)	8* + IOD	8 × 4	2.8	3.6	512 KB	96 MB	784 MB	SP3	2P	280 W (225-280)	$5590
7R13	48 (96)	6 + IOD	6 × 8	2.65	3.7	512 KB	32 MB	216 MB	SP3	TBD	TBD	OEM/AWS
7643(P)	48 (96)	8 + IOD	8 × 6	2.3	3.6	512 KB	32 MB	280 MB	SP3	2P (1P)	225 W (225-240)	$4995 ($2722)
7663	56 (112)	8 + IOD	8 × 7	2.0	3.5	512 KB	32 MB	284 MB	SP3	2P	240 W (225-240)	$6366
7663P	56 (112)	8 + IOD	8 × 7	2.0	3.5	512 KB	32 MB	284 MB	SP3	1P	240 W (225-280)	$3139
7713(P)	64 (128)	8 + IOD	8 × 8	2.0	3.675	512 KB	32 MB	288 MB	SP3	2P (1P)	225 W (225-240)	$7060 ($5010)
7763	64 (128)	8 + IOD	8 × 8	2.45	3.4	512 KB	32 MB	288 MB	SP3	2P	280 W (225-280)	$7890
7773X	64 (128)	8* + IOD	8 × 8	2.2	3.5	512 KB	96 MB	800 MB	SP3	2P	280 W (225-280)	$8800

==== Fourth generation Epyc (Genoa, Bergamo and Siena) ====
On November 10, 2022, AMD launched the fourth generation of Epyc server and data center processors based on the Zen 4 microarchitecture, codenamed Genoa. At their launch event, AMD announced that Microsoft and Google would be some of Genoa's customers. Genoa features between 16 and 96 cores with support for PCIe 5.0 and DDR5. There was also an emphasis by AMD on Genoa's energy efficiency, which according to AMD CEO Lisa Su, means "lower total cost of ownership" for enterprise and cloud datacenter clients. Genoa uses AMD's new SP5 (LGA 6096) socket.

On June 13, 2023, AMD introduced Genoa-X with 3D V-Cache technology for technical computing performance and Bergamo (9734, 9754 and 9754S) for cloud native computing.

On September 18, 2023, AMD introduced the low power Siena lineup of processors, based on the Zen 4c microarchitecture. Siena supports up to 64 cores on the new SP6 socket, which is currently only used by Siena processors. Siena uses the same I/O die as Bergamo, however certain features, such as dual socket support, are removed, and other features are reduced, such as the change from 12 channel memory support to 6 channel memory support.

In May 2024, AMD launched the Raphael lineup of processors, based on the Zen4 microarchitecture. Raphael support up to 16 cores on the AM5 socket.

Model	Fab	Cores (Threads)	Chiplets	Core config (Note: Core Complexes (CCX) × cores per CCX)	Clock rate (GHz)		Cache (MB)			Socket	Socket count	PCIe 5.0 lanes	Memory support	TDP	Release date	Price (USD)
Model	Fab	Cores (Threads)	Chiplets	Core config	Base	Boost	L1	L2	L3	Socket	Socket count	PCIe 5.0 lanes	DDR5 ECC	TDP	Release date	Price (USD)
Entry Level (Zen 4 cores)
4124P	TSMC; N5	4 (8)	1 × CCD; 1 × I/OD	1 × 4	3.8	5.1	0.256	4	16	AM5	1P	24	DDR5-5200 dual-channel	65 W	May 21, 2024	$149
4244P	TSMC; N5	6 (12)	1 × CCD; 1 × I/OD	1 × 6	3.8	5.1	0.384	6	32	AM5	1P	24	DDR5-5200 dual-channel	65 W	May 21, 2024	$229
4344P	TSMC; N5	8 (16)	1 × CCD; 1 × I/OD	1 × 8	3.8	5.3	0.5	8	32	AM5	1P	24	DDR5-5200 dual-channel	65 W	May 21, 2024	$329
4364P	TSMC; N5	8 (16)	1 × CCD; 1 × I/OD	1 × 8	4.5	5.4	0.5	8	32	AM5	1P	24	DDR5-5200 dual-channel	105 W	May 21, 2024	$399
4464P	TSMC; N5	12 (24)	2 × CCD; 1 × I/OD	2 × 6	3.7	5.4	0.768	12	64	AM5	1P	24	DDR5-5200 dual-channel	65 W	May 21, 2024	$429
4484PX	TSMC; N5	12 (24)	2 × CCD; 1 × I/OD	2 × 6	4.4	5.6	0.768	12	128	AM5	1P	24	DDR5-5200 dual-channel	120 W	May 21, 2024	$599
4564P	TSMC; N5	16 (32)	2 × CCD; 1 × I/OD	2 × 8	4.5	5.7	1	16	64	AM5	1P	24	DDR5-5200 dual-channel	170 W	May 21, 2024	$699
4584PX	TSMC; N5	16 (32)	2 × CCD; 1 × I/OD	2 × 8	4.2	5.7	1	16	128	AM5	1P	24	DDR5-5200 dual-channel	120 W	May 21, 2024	$699
Low Power & Edge (Zen 4c cores)
8024P	TSMC; N5	8 (16)	1 × CCD; 1 × I/OD	2 × 4	2.4	3.0	0.5	8	32	SP6	1P	96	DDR5-4800 six-channel	90 W	Sep 18, 2023	$409
8024PN	TSMC; N5	8 (16)	1 × CCD; 1 × I/OD	2 × 4	2.05	3.0	0.5	8	32	SP6	1P	96	DDR5-4800 six-channel	80 W	Sep 18, 2023	$525
8124P	TSMC; N5	16 (32)	2 × CCD; 1 × I/OD	4 × 4	2.45	3.0	1	16	64	SP6	1P	96	DDR5-4800 six-channel	125 W	Sep 18, 2023	$639
8124PN	TSMC; N5	16 (32)	2 × CCD; 1 × I/OD	4 × 4	2.0	3.0	1	16	64	SP6	1P	96	DDR5-4800 six-channel	100 W	Sep 18, 2023	$790
8224P	TSMC; N5	24 (48)	2 × CCD; 1 × I/OD	4 × 6	2.55	3.0	1.5	24	64	SP6	1P	96	DDR5-4800 six-channel	160 W	Sep 18, 2023	$855
8224PN	TSMC; N5	24 (48)	2 × CCD; 1 × I/OD	4 × 6	2.0	3.0	1.5	24	64	SP6	1P	96	DDR5-4800 six-channel	120 W	Sep 18, 2023	$1,015
8324P	TSMC; N5	32 (64)	4 × CCD; 1 × I/OD	8 × 4	2.65	3.0	2	32	128	SP6	1P	96	DDR5-4800 six-channel	180 W	Sep 18, 2023	$1,895
8324PN	TSMC; N5	32 (64)	4 × CCD; 1 × I/OD	8 × 4	2.05	3.0	2	32	128	SP6	1P	96	DDR5-4800 six-channel	130 W	Sep 18, 2023	$2,125
8434P	TSMC; N5	48 (96)	4 × CCD; 1 × I/OD	8 × 6	2.5	3.1	3	48	128	SP6	1P	96	DDR5-4800 six-channel	200 W	Sep 18, 2023	$2,700
8434PN	TSMC; N5	48 (96)	4 × CCD; 1 × I/OD	8 × 6	2.0	3.0	3	48	128	SP6	1P	96	DDR5-4800 six-channel	155 W	Sep 18, 2023	$3,150
8534P	TSMC; N5	64 (128)	4 × CCD; 1 × I/OD	8 × 8	2.3	3.1	4	64	128	SP6	1P	96	DDR5-4800 six-channel	200 W	Sep 18, 2023	$4,950
8534PN	TSMC; N5	64 (128)	4 × CCD; 1 × I/OD	8 × 8	2.0	3.1	4	64	128	SP6	1P	96	DDR5-4800 six-channel	175 W	Sep 18, 2023	$5,450
Mainstream Enterprise (Zen 4 cores)
9124	TSMC; N5	16 (32)	4 × CCD; 1 × I/OD	4 × 4	3.0	3.7	1	16	64	SP5	1P/2P	128	DDR5-4800 twelve-channel	200 W	Nov 10, 2022	$1,083
9224	TSMC; N5	24 (48)	4 × CCD; 1 × I/OD	4 × 6	2.5	3.7	1.5	24	64	SP5	1P/2P	128	DDR5-4800 twelve-channel	200 W	Nov 10, 2022	$1,825
9254	TSMC; N5	24 (48)	4 × CCD; 1 × I/OD	4 × 6	2.9	4.15	1.5	24	128	SP5	1P/2P	128	DDR5-4800 twelve-channel	220 W	Nov 10, 2022	$2,299
9334	TSMC; N5	32 (64)	4 × CCD; 1 × I/OD	4 × 8	2.7	3.9	2	32	128	SP5	1P/2P	128	DDR5-4800 twelve-channel	210 W	Nov 10, 2022	$2,990
9354	TSMC; N5	32 (64)	8 × CCD; 1 × I/OD	8 × 4	3.25	3.75	2	32	256	SP5	1P/2P	128	DDR5-4800 twelve-channel	280 W	Nov 10, 2022	$3,420
9354P	TSMC; N5	32 (64)	8 × CCD; 1 × I/OD	8 × 4	3.25	3.75	2	32	256	SP5	1P	128	DDR5-4800 twelve-channel	280 W	Nov 10, 2022	$2,730
Performance Enterprise (Zen 4 cores)
9174F	TSMC; N5	16 (32)	8 × CCD; 1 × I/OD	8 × 2	4.1	4.4	1	16	256	SP5	1P/2P	128	DDR5-4800 twelve-channel	320 W	Nov 10, 2022	$3,850
9184X	TSMC; N5	16 (32)	8 × CCD; 1 × I/OD	8 × 2	3.55	4.2	1	16	768	SP5	1P/2P	128	DDR5-4800 twelve-channel	320 W	Jun 13, 2023	$4,928
9274F	TSMC; N5	24 (48)	8 × CCD; 1 × I/OD	8 × 3	4.05	4.3	1.5	24	256	SP5	1P/2P	128	DDR5-4800 twelve-channel	320 W	Nov 10, 2022	$3,060
9374F	TSMC; N5	32 (64)	8 × CCD; 1 × I/OD	8 × 4	3.85	4.3	2	32	256	SP5	1P/2P	128	DDR5-4800 twelve-channel	320 W	Nov 10, 2022	$4,860
9384X	TSMC; N5	32 (64)	8 × CCD; 1 × I/OD	8 × 4	3.1	3.9	2	32	768	SP5	1P/2P	128	DDR5-4800 twelve-channel	320 W	Jun 13, 2023	$5,529
9474F	TSMC; N5	48 (96)	8 × CCD; 1 × I/OD	8 × 6	3.6	4.1	3	48	256	SP5	1P/2P	128	DDR5-4800 twelve-channel	360 W	Nov 10, 2022	$6,780
High Performance Computing (Zen 4 cores)
9454	TSMC; N5	48 (96)	8 × CCD; 1 × I/OD	8 × 6	2.75	3.8	3	48	256	SP5	1P/2P	128	DDR5-4800 twelve-channel	290 W	Nov 10, 2022	$5,225
9454P	TSMC; N5	48 (96)	8 × CCD; 1 × I/OD	8 × 6	2.75	3.8	3	48	256	SP5	1P	128	DDR5-4800 twelve-channel	290 W	Nov 10, 2022	$4,598
9534	TSMC; N5	64 (128)	8 × CCD; 1 × I/OD	8 × 8	2.45	3.7	4	64	256	SP5	1P/2P	128	DDR5-4800 twelve-channel	280 W	Nov 10, 2022	$8,803
9554	TSMC; N5	64 (128)	8 × CCD; 1 × I/OD	8 × 8	3.1	3.75	4	64	256	SP5	1P/2P	128	DDR5-4800 twelve-channel	360 W	Nov 10, 2022	$9,087
9554P	TSMC; N5	64 (128)	8 × CCD; 1 × I/OD	8 × 8	3.1	3.75	4	64	256	SP5	1P	128	DDR5-4800 twelve-channel	360 W	Nov 10, 2022	$7,104
9634	TSMC; N5	84 (168)	12 × CCD; 1 × I/OD	12 × 7	2.25	3.7	5.25	84	384	SP5	1P/2P	128	DDR5-4800 twelve-channel	290 W	Nov 10, 2022	$10,304
9654	TSMC; N5	96 (192)	12 × CCD; 1 × I/OD	12 × 8	2.4	3.7	6	96	384	SP5	1P/2P	128	DDR5-4800 twelve-channel	360 W	Nov 10, 2022	$11,805
9654P	TSMC; N5	96 (192)	12 × CCD; 1 × I/OD	12 × 8	2.4	3.7	6	96	384	SP5	1P	128	DDR5-4800 twelve-channel	360 W	Nov 10, 2022	$10,625
9684X	TSMC; N5	96 (192)	12 × CCD; 1 × I/OD	12 × 8	2.55	3.7	6	96	1152	SP5	1P/2P	128	DDR5-4800 twelve-channel	400 W	Jun 13, 2023	$14,756
Cloud (Zen 4c cores)
9734	TSMC; N5	112 (224)	8 × CCD; 1 × I/OD	16 × 7	2.2	3.0	7	112	256	SP5	1P/2P	128	DDR5-4800 twelve-channel	340 W	Jun 13, 2023	$9,600
9754S	TSMC; N5	128 (128)	8 × CCD; 1 × I/OD	16 × 8	2.25	3.1	8	128	256	SP5	1P/2P	128	DDR5-4800 twelve-channel	360 W	Jun 13, 2023	$10,200
9754	TSMC; N5	128 (256)	8 × CCD; 1 × I/OD	16 × 8	2.25	3.1	8	128	256	SP5	1P/2P	128	DDR5-4800 twelve-channel	360 W	Jun 13, 2023	$11,900

==== Fifth generation Epyc (Grado, Sorano, Turin and Turin Dense) ====
The fifth generation of Epyc processors were showcased by AMD at Computex 2024 on June 3. Named the Epyc 9005 series, it will come in two variants:

- Zen 5 based, up to 128 cores and 256 threads, built on TSMC N4X process
- Zen 5c based, up to 192 cores and 384 threads, built on TSMC N3E process

Both variants are officially referred to under the Turin codename by AMD, although the nickname of "Turin Dense" has also been used to refer to the Zen 5c based CPUs.

Turin Dense support the x2AVIC CPU feature. (Note: x2AVIC: Extended AMD Virtual Interrupt Controller – an AMD technology to accelerate virtualization by supporting x2APIC mode, generally in high-core-count VMs. x2APIC is an Intel technology to improve performance and scalability of interrupt handling.)

Both of these processor series will be socket-compatible with the SP5 socket used by Genoa and Bergamo. Epyc 9005 series were launched on October 10, 2024, at AMD's Advancing AI event 2024.

In May 2025, AMD announced the Epyc 4005 series of processors, codenamed Grado. They are based on the Zen 5 microarchitecture and support up to 16 cores. Unlike the 9005 series, these processors are Socket AM5 compatible.

Model	Fab	Cores (Threads)	Chiplets	Core config (Note: Core Complexes (CCX) × cores per CCX)	Clock rate (GHz)		Cache (MB)			Socket	Socket count	PCIe 5.0 lanes	Memory support	Thermal design power (TDP)	Release date	Release price (USD)
Model	Fab	Cores (Threads)	Chiplets	Core config	Base	Boost	L1 Per Core	L2 Per Core	L3 Shared	Socket	Socket count	PCIe 5.0 lanes	Memory support	Thermal design power (TDP)	Release date	Release price (USD)
Turin Dense (Zen 5c cores)
9645	TSMC; N3E	96 (192)	8 × CCD; 1 × I/OD	8 × 12	2.3	3.7	80 KB	1 MB	256 MB	SP5	1P/2P	128 (160 in 2-socket systems)	DDR5-6400 twelve-channel	320 W	10 Oct, 2024	$11048
9745	TSMC; N3E	128 (256)	8 × CCD; 1 × I/OD	8 × 16	2.4	3.7	80 KB	1 MB	256 MB	SP5	1P/2P	128 (160 in 2-socket systems)	DDR5-6400 twelve-channel	400 W	10 Oct, 2024	$12141
9825	TSMC; N3E	144 (288)	12 × CCD; 1 × I/OD	12 × 12	2.2	3.7	80 KB	1 MB	384 MB	SP5	1P/2P	128 (160 in 2-socket systems)	DDR5-6400 twelve-channel	390 W	10 Oct, 2024	$13006
9845	TSMC; N3E	160 (320)	10 × CCD; 1 × I/OD	10 × 16	2.1	3.7	80 KB	1 MB	320 MB	SP5	1P/2P	128 (160 in 2-socket systems)	DDR5-6400 twelve-channel	390 W	10 Oct, 2024	$13564
9965	TSMC; N3E	192 (384)	12 × CCD; 1 × I/OD	12 × 16	2.25	3.7	80 KB	1 MB	384 MB	SP5	1P/2P	128 (160 in 2-socket systems)	DDR5-6400 twelve-channel	500 W	10 Oct, 2024	$14813
Turin (Zen 5 cores)
9015	TSMC; N4X	8 (16)	2 × CCD; 1 × I/OD	2 × 4	3.6	4.1	80 KB	1 MB	64 MB	SP5	1P/2P	128 (160 in 2-socket systems)	DDR5-6400 twelve-channel	125 W	10 Oct, 2024	$527
9115	TSMC; N4X	16 (32)	2 × CCD; 1 × I/OD	2 × 8	2.6	4.1	80 KB	1 MB	64 MB	SP5	1P/2P	128 (160 in 2-socket systems)	DDR5-6400 twelve-channel	125 W	10 Oct, 2024	$726
9135	TSMC; N4X	16 (32)	2 × CCD; 1 × I/OD	2 × 8	3.65	4.3	80 KB	1 MB	64 MB	SP5	1P/2P	128 (160 in 2-socket systems)	DDR5-6400 twelve-channel	200 W	10 Oct, 2024	$1214
9175F	TSMC; N4X	16 (32)	16 × CCD; 1 × I/OD	16 × 1	4.2	5.0	80 KB	1 MB	512 MB	SP5	1P/2P	128 (160 in 2-socket systems)	DDR5-6400 twelve-channel	320 W	10 Oct, 2024	$4256
9255	TSMC; N4X	24 (48)	4 × CCD; 1 × I/OD	4 × 6	3.25	4.3	80 KB	1 MB	128 MB	SP5	1P/2P	128 (160 in 2-socket systems)	DDR5-6400 twelve-channel	200 W	10 Oct, 2024	$2495
9275F	TSMC; N4X	24 (48)	8 × CCD; 1 × I/OD	8 × 3	4.1	4.8	80 KB	1 MB	256 MB	SP5	1P/2P	128 (160 in 2-socket systems)	DDR5-6400 twelve-channel	320 W	10 Oct, 2024	$3439
9335	TSMC; N4X	32 (64)	4 × CCD; 1 × I/OD	4 × 8	3.0	4.4	80 KB	1 MB	128 MB	SP5	1P/2P	128 (160 in 2-socket systems)	DDR5-6400 twelve-channel	210 W	10 Oct, 2024	$3178
9355P	TSMC; N4X	32 (64)	8 × CCD; 1 × I/OD	8 × 4	3.55	4.4	80 KB	1 MB	256 MB	SP5	1P	128	DDR5-6400 twelve-channel	280 W	10 Oct, 2024	$2998
9355	TSMC; N4X	32 (64)	8 × CCD; 1 × I/OD	8 × 4	3.55	4.4	80 KB	1 MB	256 MB	SP5	1P/2P	128 (160 in 2-socket systems)	DDR5-6400 twelve-channel	280 W	10 Oct, 2024	$3694
9375F	TSMC; N4X	32 (64)	8 × CCD; 1 × I/OD	8 × 4	3.8	4.8	80 KB	1 MB	256 MB	SP5	1P/2P	128 (160 in 2-socket systems)	DDR5-6400 twelve-channel	320 W	10 Oct, 2024	$5306
9365	TSMC; N4X	36 (72)	6 × CCD; 1 × I/OD	6 × 6	3.4	4.3	80 KB	1 MB	192 MB	SP5	1P/2P	128 (160 in 2-socket systems)	DDR5-6400 twelve-channel	300 W	10 Oct, 2024	$4341
9455P	TSMC; N4X	48 (96)	8 × CCD; 1 × I/OD	8 × 6	3.15	4.4	80 KB	1 MB	256 MB	SP5	1P	128	DDR5-6400 twelve-channel	300 W	10 Oct, 2024	$4819
9455	TSMC; N4X	48 (96)	8 × CCD; 1 × I/OD	8 × 6	3.15	4.4	80 KB	1 MB	256 MB	SP5	1P/2P	128 (160 in 2-socket systems)	DDR5-6400 twelve-channel	300 W	10 Oct, 2024	$5412
9475F	TSMC; N4X	48 (96)	8 × CCD; 1 × I/OD	8 × 6	3.65	4.8	80 KB	1 MB	256 MB	SP5	1P/2P	128 (160 in 2-socket systems)	DDR5-6400 twelve-channel	400 W	10 Oct, 2024	$7592
9535	TSMC; N4X	64 (128)	8 × CCD; 1 × I/OD	8 × 8	2.4	4.3	80 KB	1 MB	256 MB	SP5	1P/2P	128 (160 in 2-socket systems)	DDR5-6400 twelve-channel	300 W	10 Oct, 2024	$8992
9555P	TSMC; N4X	64 (128)	8 × CCD; 1 × I/OD	8 × 8	3.2	4.4	80 KB	1 MB	256 MB	SP5	1P	128	DDR5-6400 twelve-channel	360 W	10 Oct, 2024	$7983
9555	TSMC; N4X	64 (128)	8 × CCD; 1 × I/OD	8 × 8	3.2	4.4	80 KB	1 MB	256 MB	SP5	1P/2P	128 (160 in 2-socket systems)	DDR5-6400 twelve-channel	360 W	10 Oct, 2024	$9826
9575F	TSMC; N4X	64 (128)	8 × CCD; 1 × I/OD	8 × 8	3.3	5.0	80 KB	1 MB	256 MB	SP5	1P/2P	128 (160 in 2-socket systems)	DDR5-6400 twelve-channel	400 W	10 Oct, 2024	$11791
9565	TSMC; N4X	72 (144)	12 × CCD; 1 × I/OD	12 × 6	3.15	4.3	80 KB	1 MB	384 MB	SP5	1P/2P	128 (160 in 2-socket systems)	DDR5-6400 twelve-channel	400 W	10 Oct, 2024	$10468
9655P	TSMC; N4X	96 (192)	12 × CCD; 1 × I/OD	12 × 8	2.5	4.5	80 KB	1 MB	384 MB	SP5	1P	128	DDR5-6400 twelve-channel	400 W	10 Oct, 2024	$10811
9655	TSMC; N4X	96 (192)	12 × CCD; 1 × I/OD	12 × 8	2.5	4.5	80 KB	1 MB	384 MB	SP5	1P/2P	128 (160 in 2-socket systems)	DDR5-6400 twelve-channel	400 W	10 Oct, 2024	$11852
9755	TSMC; N4X	128 (256)	16 × CCD; 1 × I/OD	16 × 8	2.7	4.1	80 KB	1 MB	512 MB	SP5	1P/2P	128 (160 in 2-socket systems)	DDR5-6400 twelve-channel	500 W	10 Oct, 2024	$12984
Sorano (Zen 5 cores)
8025P	TSMC; N4X	8 (16)	2 × CCD; 1 × I/OD	2 × 4	2.9	4.5	80 KB	1 MB	64 MB	SP6	1P	96	DDR5-6400 six-channel	95 W	9 May, 2026	$529
8125P	TSMC; N4X	16 (32)	2 × CCD; 1 × I/OD	2 × 8	2.65	4.5	80 KB	1 MB	64 MB	SP6	1P	96	DDR5-6400 six-channel	125 W	9 May, 2026	$799
8225P	TSMC; N4X	24 (48)	4 × CCD; 1 × I/OD	4 × 6	2.95	4.5	80 KB	1 MB	128 MB	SP6	1P	96	DDR5-6400 six-channel	160 W	9 May, 2026	$1079
8325P	TSMC; N4X	32 (64)	8 × CCD; 1 × I/OD	8 × 4	2.7	4.5	80 KB	1 MB	256 MB	SP6	1P	96	DDR5-6400 six-channel	175 W	9 May, 2026	$2299
8435P	TSMC; N4X	48 (96)	8 × CCD; 1 × I/OD	8 × 6	2.45	4.5	80 KB	1 MB	256 MB	SP6	1P	96	DDR5-6400 six-channel	200 W	9 May, 2026	$3099
8535P	TSMC; N4X	64 (128)	8 × CCD; 1 × I/OD	8 × 8	2.0	4.5	80 KB	1 MB	256 MB	SP6	1P	96	DDR5-6400 six-channel	210 W	9 May, 2026	$5499
8635P	TSMC; N4X	84 (168)	12 × CCD; 1 × I/OD	12 × 7	1.6	4.5	80 KB	1 MB	384 MB	SP6	1P	96	DDR5-6400 six-channel	225 W	9 May, 2026	$5799
Grado (Zen 5 cores)
4245P	TSMC; N4X	6 (12)	1 × CCD; 1 × I/OD	1 × 6	3.9	5.4	80 KB	1 MB	32 MB	AM5	1P	28	DDR5-5600 dual-channel	65 W	13 May, 2025	$239
4345P	TSMC; N4X	8 (16)	1 × CCD; 1 × I/OD	1 × 8	3.8	5.5	80 KB	1 MB	32 MB	AM5	1P	28	DDR5-5600 dual-channel	65 W	13 May, 2025	$329
4465P	TSMC; N4X	12 (24)	2 × CCD; 1 × I/OD	2 × 6	3.4	5.4	80 KB	1 MB	64 MB	AM5	1P	28	DDR5-5600 dual-channel	65 W	13 May, 2025	$399
4545P	TSMC; N4X	16 (32)	2 × CCD; 1 × I/OD	2 × 8	3.0	5.4	80 KB	1 MB	64 MB	AM5	1P	28	DDR5-5600 dual-channel	65 W	13 May, 2025	$549
4565P	TSMC; N4X	16 (32)	2 × CCD; 1 × I/OD	2 × 8	4.3	5.7	80 KB	1 MB	64 MB	AM5	1P	28	DDR5-5600 dual-channel	170 W	13 May, 2025	$589
4585PX	TSMC; N4X	16 (32)	2 × CCD; 1 × I/OD	2 × 8	4.3	5.7	80 KB	1 MB	128 MB	AM5	1P	28	DDR5-5600 dual-channel	170 W	13 May, 2025	$699

==== Sixth generation Epyc (Venice and Venice Dense) ====
Model	Fab	Cores (Threads)	Clock rate (GHz)		Cache (MiB)			Socket	Socket count	PCIe 6.0 lanes	Memory support	Thermal design power (TDP)	Release date	Release price (USD)
Model	Fab	Cores (Threads)	Base	Boost	L1 Per Core	L2 Per Core	L3 Shared	Socket	Socket count	PCIe 6.0 lanes	Memory support	Thermal design power (TDP)	Release date	Release price (USD)
Venice SP7
9586F	TSMC; N2	64 (128)	3.75	5.0	80 KiB	1 MiB	384 MiB	SP7	1P/2P	96 (128 in 2-socket systems)	DDR5 (8000 MT/s) MRDIMM (12800 MT/s) sixteen-channel	500 W	Q4 2026	$9701
9556	TSMC; N2	64 (128)	2.75	4.3	80 KiB	1 MiB	384 MiB	SP7	1P/2P	96 (128 in 2-socket systems)	DDR5 (8000 MT/s) MRDIMM (12800 MT/s) sixteen-channel	300 W	Q4 2026	$8008
9686F	TSMC; N2	96 (192)	3.4	5.0	80 KiB	1 MiB	384 MiB	SP7	1P/2P	96 (128 in 2-socket systems)	DDR5 (8000 MT/s) MRDIMM (12800 MT/s) sixteen-channel	500 W	Q4 2026	$11434
9656	TSMC; N2	96 (192)	3.05	3.7	80 KiB	1 MiB	512 MiB	SP7	1P/2P	96 (128 in 2-socket systems)	DDR5 (8000 MT/s) MRDIMM (12800 MT/s) sixteen-channel	400 W	Q4 2026	$9713
9G76	TSMC; N2	96 (192)	3.4	4.8	80 KiB	1 MiB	384 MiB	SP7	1P/2P	96 (128 in 2-socket systems)	DDR5 (8000 MT/s) MRDIMM (12800 MT/s) sixteen-channel	500 W	Q4 2026	$11622
9756	TSMC; N2	128 (256)	3.15	4.0	80 KiB	1 MiB	512 MiB	SP7	1P/2P	96 (128 in 2-socket systems)	DDR5 (8000 MT/s) MRDIMM (12800 MT/s) sixteen-channel	500 W	Q4 2026	$12489
9846	TSMC; N2	168 (336)	2.85	3.7	80 KiB	1 MiB	768 MiB	SP7	1P/2P	96 (128 in 2-socket systems)	DDR5 (8000 MT/s) MRDIMM (12800 MT/s) sixteen-channel	500 W	Q4 2026	$13114
9966	TSMC; N2	192 (384)	2.9	4.0	80 KiB	1 MiB	768 MiB	SP7	1P/2P	96 (128 in 2-socket systems)	DDR5 (8000 MT/s) MRDIMM (12800 MT/s) sixteen-channel	600 W	Q4 2026	$14079
9996	TSMC; N2	256 (512)	2.55	4.1	80 KiB	1 MiB	1024 MiB	SP7	1P/2P	96 (128 in 2-socket systems)	DDR5 (8000 MT/s) MRDIMM (12800 MT/s) sixteen-channel	600 W	Q4 2026	$14904
Venice SP8
9016	TSMC; N2	8 (16)	3.05	4.8	80 KiB	1 MiB	48 MiB	SP8	1P/2P	128 (192 in 2-socket systems)	DDR5 (8000 MT/s) eight-channel	130 W	Q1 2027	$700
9116	TSMC; N2	16 (32)	2.85	4.5	80 KiB	1 MiB	48 MiB	SP8	1P/2P	128 (192 in 2-socket systems)	DDR5 (8000 MT/s) eight-channel	160 W	Q1 2027	$1200
9176F	TSMC; N2	16 (32)	3.9	5.0	80 KiB	1 MiB	192 MiB	SP8	1P/2P	128 (192 in 2-socket systems)	DDR5 (8000 MT/s) eight-channel	200 W	Q1 2027	$3787
9256	TSMC; N2	24 (48)	2.85	4.5	80 KiB	1 MiB	96 MiB	SP8	1P/2P	128 (192 in 2-socket systems)	DDR5 (8000 MT/s) eight-channel	190 W	Q1 2027	$2501
9276F	TSMC; N2	24 (48)	3.8	5.0	80 KiB	1 MiB	96 MiB	SP8	1P/2P	128 (192 in 2-socket systems)	DDR5 (8000 MT/s) eight-channel	230 W	Q1 2027	$3512
9336	TSMC; N2	32 (64)	3.15	3.7	80 KiB	1 MiB	128 MiB	SP8	1P/2P	128 (192 in 2-socket systems)	DDR5 (8000 MT/s) eight-channel	195 W	Q1 2027	$3320
9356	TSMC; N2	32 (64)	3.6	4.5	80 KiB	1 MiB	192 MiB	SP8	1P/2P	128 (192 in 2-socket systems)	DDR5 (8000 MT/s) eight-channel	250 W	Q1 2027	$3789
9356P	TSMC; N2	32 (64)	3.6	4.5	80 KiB	1 MiB	192 MiB	SP8	1P	128 (192 in 2-socket systems)	DDR5 (8000 MT/s) eight-channel	250 W	Q1 2027	$2795
9376F	TSMC; N2	32 (64)	3.8	5.0	80 KiB	1 MiB	192 MiB	SP8	1P/2P	128 (192 in 2-socket systems)	DDR5 (8000 MT/s) eight-channel	285 W	Q1 2027	$4849
9456	TSMC; N2	48 (96)	3.2	3.7	80 KiB	1 MiB	256 MiB	SP8	1P/2P	128 (192 in 2-socket systems)	DDR5 (8000 MT/s) eight-channel	265 W	Q1 2027	$5252
9456P	TSMC; N2	48 (96)	3.2	3.7	80 KiB	1 MiB	256 MiB	SP8	1P	128 (192 in 2-socket systems)	DDR5 (8000 MT/s) eight-channel	265 W	Q1 2027	$4628
9476F	TSMC; N2	48 (96)	3.65	5.0	80 KiB	1 MiB	192 MiB	SP8	1P/2P	128 (192 in 2-socket systems)	DDR5 (8000 MT/s) eight-channel	330 W	Q1 2027	$6695
9526	TSMC; N2	64 (128)	2.75	3.7	80 KiB	1 MiB	256 MiB	SP8	1P/2P	128 (192 in 2-socket systems)	DDR5 (8000 MT/s) eight-channel	220 W	Q1 2027	$7123
9536	TSMC; N2	64 (128)	3.25	4.0	80 KiB	1 MiB	256 MiB	SP8	1P/2P	128 (192 in 2-socket systems)	DDR5 (8000 MT/s) eight-channel	300 W	Q1 2027	$7837
9536P	TSMC; N2	64 (128)	3.25	4.0	80 KiB	1 MiB	256 MiB	SP8	1P	128 (192 in 2-socket systems)	DDR5 (8000 MT/s) eight-channel	300 W	Q1 2027	$6595
9576F	TSMC; N2	64 (128)	3.55	5.0	80 KiB	1 MiB	384 MiB	SP8	1P/2P	128 (192 in 2-socket systems)	DDR5 (8000 MT/s) eight-channel	400 W	Q1 2027	$9431
9646	TSMC; N2	96 (192)	2.8	3.7	80 KiB	1 MiB	256 MiB	SP8	1P/2P	128 (192 in 2-socket systems)	DDR5 (8000 MT/s) eight-channel	300 W	Q1 2027	$8904
9646P	TSMC; N2	96 (192)	2.8	3.7	80 KiB	1 MiB	256 MiB	SP8	1P	128 (192 in 2-socket systems)	DDR5 (8000 MT/s) eight-channel	300 W	Q1 2027	$8001
9676F	TSMC; N2	96 (192)	3.1	5.0	80 KiB	1 MiB	384 MiB	SP8	1P/2P	128 (192 in 2-socket systems)	DDR5 (8000 MT/s) eight-channel	400 W	Q1 2027	$10116
9736	TSMC; N2	128 (256)	2.7	3.7	80 KiB	1 MiB	256 MiB	SP8	1P/2P	128 (192 in 2-socket systems)	DDR5 (8000 MT/s) eight-channel	360 W	Q1 2027	$10639
9736P	TSMC; N2	128 (256)	2.7	3.7	80 KiB	1 MiB	256 MiB	SP8	1P	128 (192 in 2-socket systems)	DDR5 (8000 MT/s) eight-channel	360 W	Q1 2027	$9989
9746	TSMC; N2	128 (256)	2.9	4.0	80 KiB	1 MiB	512 MiB	SP8	1P/2P	128 (192 in 2-socket systems)	DDR5 (8000 MT/s) eight-channel	400 W	Q1 2027	$11679

=== Embedded ===
==== First generation Epyc (Snowy Owl) ====
In February 2018, AMD also announced the Epyc 3000 series of embedded Zen CPUs.

Common features of EPYC Embedded 3000 series CPUs:

- Socket: SP4 (31xx and 32xx models use SP4r2 package).
- All the CPUs support ECC DDR4-2666 in dual-channel mode (3201 supports only DDR4-2133), while 33xx and 34xx models support quad-channel mode.
- L1 cache: 96 KB (32 KB data + 64 KB instruction) per core.
- L2 cache: 512 KB per core.
- All the CPUs support 32 PCIe 3.0 lanes per CCD (max 64 lanes).
- Fabrication process: GlobalFoundries 14 nm.

Model	Cores (threads)	Clock rate (GHz)			L3 cache (total)	TDP	Chiplets	Core config (Note: Core Complexes (CCX) × cores per CCX)	Release date
Model	Cores (threads)	Base	Boost		L3 cache (total)	TDP	Chiplets	Core config	Release date
Model	Cores (threads)	Base	All-core	Max	L3 cache (total)	TDP	Chiplets	Core config	Release date
3101	4 (4)	2.1	2.9	2.9	8 MB	35 W	1 × CCD	1 × 4	Feb 2018
3151	4 (8)	2.7	2.9	2.9	16 MB	45 W	1 × CCD	2 × 2	Feb 2018
3201	8 (8)	1.5	3.1	3.1	16 MB	30 W	1 × CCD	2 × 4	Feb 2018
3251	8 (16)	2.5	3.1	3.1	16 MB	55 W	1 × CCD	2 × 4	Feb 2018
3255	8 (16)	2.5	3.1	3.1	16 MB	25–55 W	1 × CCD	2 × 4	Dec 2018
3301	12 (12)	2.0	2.15	3.0	32 MB	65 W	2 × CCD	4 × 3	Feb 2018
3351	12 (24)	1.9	2.75	3.0	32 MB	60–80 W	2 × CCD	4 × 3	Feb 2018
3401	16 (16)	1.85	2.25	3.0	32 MB	85 W	2 × CCD	4 × 4	Feb 2018
3451	16 (32)	2.15	2.45	3.0	32 MB	80–100 W	2 × CCD	4 × 4	Feb 2018

==== Later embedded models ====
Starting with Zen 2, the embedded option simply shares the same name as the socket equivalent, hence the EPYC Embedded 7002, 7003, 8004, 9004, 4005 and 9005 series.

== Chinese variants ==
A variant created for the Chinese server market by Hygon Information Technology is the Hygon Dhyana system on a chip. It is noted to be a variant of the AMD Epyc, and is so similar that "there is little to no differentiation between the chips". It has been noted that there is "less than 200 lines of new kernel code" for Linux kernel support, and that the Dhyana is "mostly a re-branded Zen CPU for the Chinese server market". Later benchmarks showed that certain floating point instructions are performing worse, probably to comply with US export restrictions. AES and other western cryptography algorithms are replaced by Chinese variants throughout the design.
