= Zen 5 =

2024 AMD 4-nanometer processor microarchitecture

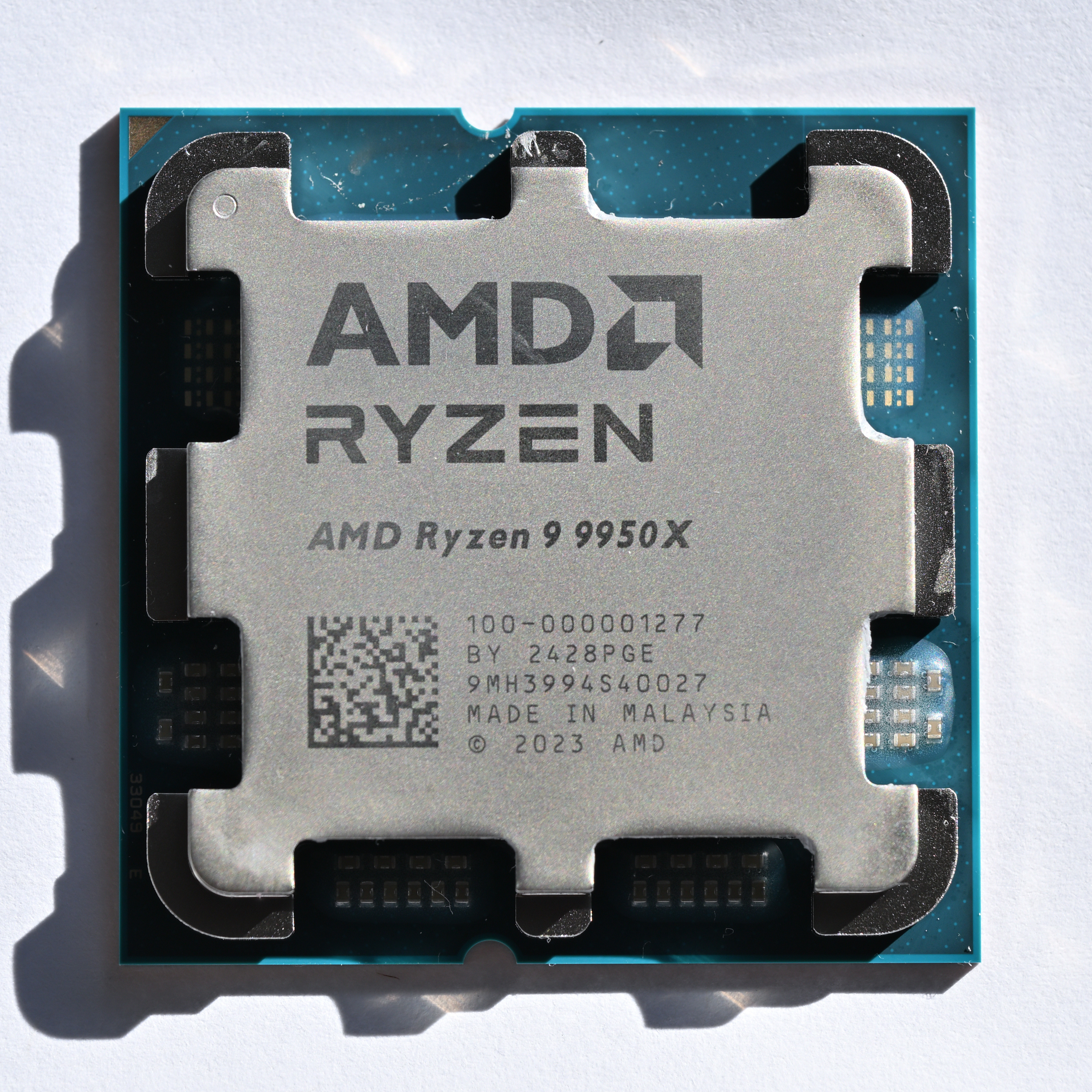
- AMD Ryzen 9 9950X

General information
- Launched: Mobile; July 17, 2024; 2 years ago Desktop; August 8, 2024; 2 years ago High-end Desktop; August 30, 2025; 14 months ago Server; October 10, 2024; 2 years ago
- Designed by: AMD
- Common manufacturer: TSMC
- CPUID code: Family 1Ah

Performance
- Max. CPU clock rate: 2.0 GHz to 5.7 GHz

Physical specifications
- Transistors: 8.315 billion (per CCD)
- Cores: Mobile: 8 to 12 Desktop: 6 to 16 HEDT: 24 to 96 Server: 16 to 192
- Memory (RAM): DDR5
- GPU: RDNA 2
- Package: FP8, FL1
- Sockets: Desktop; Socket AM5; Server; Socket SP5; HEDT/Workstation; Socket sTR5

Cache
- L1 cache: 80 KB (per core): 32 KB instructions; 48 KB data
- L2 cache: 1 MB (per core)
- L3 cache: 32–128 MB (32 MB per CCD + 64 MB with 3D V-cache); 24 MB (in Strix Point)

Architecture and classification
- Technology node: TSMC N4X (Zen 5 CCD); TSMC N3E (Zen 5c CCD); TSMC N6 (IOD); TSMC N4P (Mobile)
- Microarchitecture: Zen
- Instruction set: AMD64 (x86-64)
- Extensions: Crypto AES, SHA; SIMD MMX-plus, SSE, SSE2, SSE3, SSSE3, SSE4.1, SSE4.2, SSE4A, FMA3, AVX, AVX2, AVX-512, AVX-VNNI; Virtualization AMD-V

Products, models, variants
- Core names: Zen 5; Nirvana; Zen 5c; Prometheus
- Product code names: Desktop; Granite Ridge; Gorgon Point; HEDT/Workstation; Shimada Peak; Thin & Light Mobile; Strix Point; Krackan Point; Gorgon Point; Extreme Mobile; Strix Halo; Fire Range; Gorgon Halo; Server; Turin; Turin Dense
- Models: Ryzen 9000; Ryzen Pro 9000; Threadripper 9000; Threadripper Pro 9000; Ryzen AI 300; Ryzen AI Pro 300; Ryzen AI Max 300; Epyc 9000
- Brand names: Ryzen; Ryzen AI; Epyc; Threadripper

History
- Predecessor: Zen 4
- Successor: Zen 6

Support status
- Supported

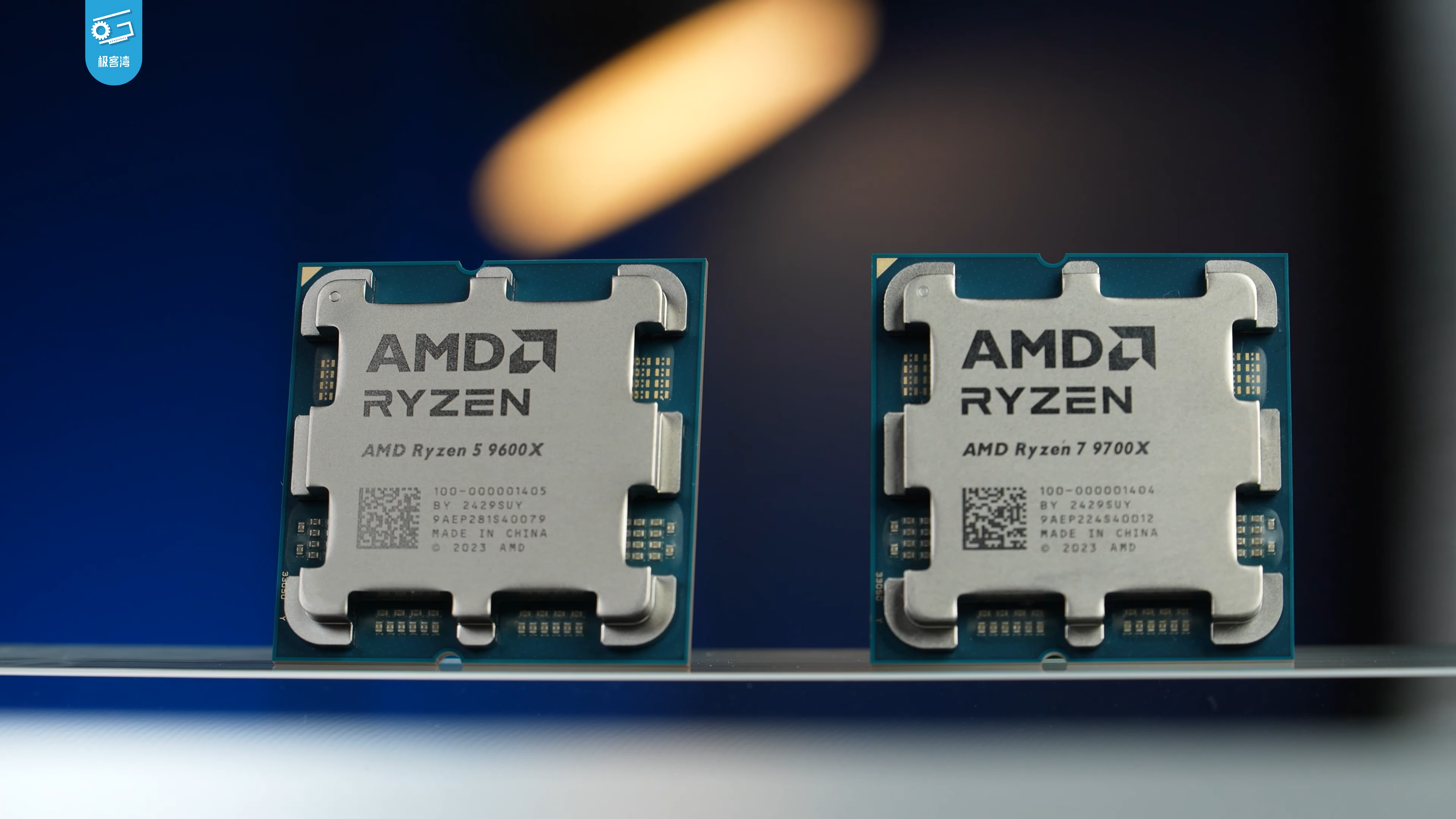
Two AMD Ryzen 9000 series microprocessors with Zen 5 architecture

Zen 5 ("Nirvana") is a microarchitecture for CPUs by AMD, shown on their roadmap in May 2022, launched for mobile in July 2024 and for desktop in August 2024. It is the successor to Zen 4 and is currently fabricated on TSMC's N4P process. Zen 5 is also planned to be fabricated on the N3E process in the future.

The Zen 5 microarchitecture powers Ryzen 9000 series desktop processors (codenamed "Granite Ridge"), Epyc 9005 server processors (codenamed "Turin"), and Ryzen AI 300 thin and light mobile processors (codenamed "Strix Point").

== Background ==
Zen 5 was first officially mentioned during AMD's Ryzen Processors: One Year Later presentation on April 9, 2018.

A roadmap shown during AMD's Financial Analyst Day on June 9, 2022 confirmed that Zen 5 and Zen 5c would be launching in 3 nm and 4 nm variants in 2024. The earliest details on the Zen 5 architecture promised a "re-pipelined front end and wide issue" with "integrated AI and Machine Learning optimizations".

During AMD's Q4 2023 earnings call on January 30, 2024, AMD CEO Lisa Su stated that Zen 5 products would be "coming in the second half of the year".

== Architecture ==
Die-Shot of an AMD Ryzen 5 9600X with a Zen 5 microarchitecture

Zen 5 is a ground-up redesign of Zen 4 with a wider front-end, increased floating-point throughput, and more-accurate branch prediction.

=== Fabrication process ===
Zen 5 was designed with both 4 nm and 3 nm processes in mind. This acted as an insurance policy for AMD in the event that TSMC's mass production of its N3 nodes were to face delays, significant wafer defect issues, or capacity issues. One industry analyst estimated early N3 wafer yields to be at 55% while others estimated yields to be similar to those of N5 at between 60-80%. Additionally, Apple, as TSMC's largest customer, gets priority access to the latest process nodes. In 2022, Apple was responsible for 23% of TSMC's $72 billion in total revenue. After N3 began ramping at the end of 2022, Apple bought up the entirety of TSMC's early N3B wafer production capacity to fabricate their A17 and M3 SoCs. Zen 5 desktop and server processors continue to use the N6 node for the I/O die fabrication.

Zen 5 Core Complex Dies (CCDs) are fabricated on TSMC's N4X node which is intended to accommodate higher frequencies for high-performance computing (HPC) applications. Zen 4-based mobile processors were fabricated on the N4P node which is targeted more toward power efficiency. N4X maintains IP compatibility with N4P and offers a 6% frequency gain over N4P at the same power but comes with the trade-off of moderate leakage. Compared to the N5 node used to produce Zen 4 CCDs, N4X can enable up to 15% higher frequencies while running at 1.2V.

The Zen 5 CCD, codenamed "Eldora", has a die size of 70.6mm^{2}, a 0.5% reduction in area from Zen 4's 71mm^{2} CCD while achieving a 28% increase in transistor density due to the N4X process node. Zen 5's CCD contains 8.315 billion transistors compared to the Zen 4 CCD's 6.5 billion transistors. One Zen 5 core is larger than one Zen 4 core, but the CCD has been reduced via shrinking the L3 cache. The monolithic die used by "Strix Point" mobile processors, fabricated on TSMC's lower power N4P node, measures 232.5mm^{2} in area.

=== Front end ===
==== Branch prediction ====
Zen 5's changes to branch prediction are the most significant divergence from any previous Zen microarchitecture. The branch predictor in a core tries to predict the outcome when there are diverging code paths. Zen 5's branch predictor is able to operate two-ahead where it can predict up to two branches per clock cycle. Previous architectures were limited to one branch instruction per clock cycle, limiting the instruction-fetch throughput of branch-heavy programs. Two-ahead branch predictors have been discussed in academic research dating back to André Seznec et al.'s 1996 paper "Multiple-block ahead branch predictors". 28 years after it was first proposed in academic research, AMD's Zen 5 architecture became the first microarchitecture to fully implement two-ahead branch prediction. Increased data prefetching assists the branch predictor.

=== Execution engines ===
==== Integer units ====
Zen 5 contains six Arithmetic Logic Units (ALUs), up from four ALUs in prior Zen architectures. A greater number of ALUs that handle common integer operations can increase per-cycle scalar integer throughput by 50%.

==== Vector engines and instructions ====
The vector engine in Zen 5 features four floating-point pipes compared to three pipes in Zen 4. Zen 4 introduced AVX-512 instructions. AVX-512 capabilities have been expanded with Zen 5 with a doubling of the floating-point pipe width to a native 512-bit floating-point datapath. The AVX-512 datapath is configurable depending on the product. Ryzen 9000 series desktop processors and EPYC 9005 server processors feature the full 512-bit datapath, but Ryzen AI 300/400 mobile processors feature a 256-bit datapath to reduce power consumption. AVX-512 instructions have been extended with the VP2INTERSECT extension, in addition to 256-bit AVX-VNNI. Additionally, there is greater bfloat16 throughput.

=== Cache ===
==== L1 ====
The wider front end in the Zen 5 architecture necessitates larger caches and higher memory bandwidth in order to keep the cores fed with data. The L1 cache per core is increased from 64 KB to 80 KB per core. The L1 instruction cache remains the same at 32 KB but the L1 data cache is increased from 32 KB to 48 KB per core. Furthermore, the bandwidth of the L1 data cache for 512-bit floating-point unit pipes has also been doubled. The L1 data cache's associativity has increased from 8-way to 12-way in order to accommodate its larger size.

==== L2 ====
The L2 cache remains at 1 MB but its associativity has increased from 8-way to 16-way. Zen 5 also has a doubled L2 cache bandwidth of 64 bytes per clock.

Cache		Zen 4	Zen 5
L1 (Data)	Size	32 KB	48 KB
L1 (Data)	Associativity	8-way	12-way
L1 (Data)	Bandwidth	32B/clk	64B/clk
L1 (In- struc- tions)	Size	32 KB	32 KB
L1 (In- struc- tions)	Associativity	8-way	8-way
L1 (In- struc- tions)	Bandwidth	64B/clk	64B/clk
L2	Size	1 MB	1 MB
L2	Associativity	8-way	16-way
L2	Bandwidth	32B/clk	64B/clk
L3	Size	32 MB	32 MB
L3	Associativity	16-way	16-way
L3	Bandwidth	32B/clk Read; 16B/clk Write	32B/clk Read; 16B/clk Write

==== L3 ====
The L3 cache is filled from L2 cache victims and in-flight misses. Latency for accessing the L3 cache has been reduced by 3.5 cycles. A Zen 5 Core Complex Die (CCD) contains 32 MB of L3 cache shared between the 8 cores. In Zen 5 3D V-Cache CCDs, a piece of silicon containing 64 MB of extra L3 cache is placed under the cores rather than on top like in prior generations for a total of 96 MB. This allows for increased core frequency compared to previous generation 3D V-Cache implementations which were sensitive to higher voltages. The Zen 5-based Ryzen 7 9800X3D has a 500 MHz increased base frequency over the Zen 4-based Ryzen 7 7800X3D and allows overclocking for the first time.

Ryzen AI 300 APUs, codenamed "Strix Point", features 24 MB of total L3 cache which is split into two separate cache arrays. 16 MB of dedicated L3 cache is shared by the 4 Zen 5 cores and 8 MB is shared by the 8 Zen 5c cores. Zen 5c cores are not able to access the 16 MB L3 cache array and vice versa.

=== Other changes ===
Other features and changes in the Zen 5 architecture, compared to Zen 4, include:

- Memory speeds up to DDR5-5600 (From DDR5-5200) and LPDDR5X-7500 are officially supported.

Zen 4 vs Zen 5 capabilities
Attribute	Zen 4	Zen 5
L1/L2 BTB	1.5K/7K	16K/8K
Return Address Stack	32	52
ITLB L1/L2	64/512	64/2048
Fetched/Decoded Instruction Bytes/cycle	32	64
Op Cache associativity	12-way	16-way
Op Cache bandwidth	9 macro-ops	12 inst or fused inst
Dispatch bandwidth (macro-ops/cycle)	6	8
AGU Scheduler	3x24 ALU/AGU	56
ALU Scheduler	1x24 ALU	88
ALU/AGU	4/3	6/4
Int PRF (red/flag)	224/126	240/192
Vector Reg	192	384
FP Pre-Sched Queue	64	96
FP Scheduler	2x32	3x38
FP Pipes	3	4
Vector Width	256	256b/512b
ROB/Retire Queue	320	448
LS Mem Pipes support Load/Store	3/1	4/2
DTLB L1/L2	72/3072	96/4096

== Products ==
=== Desktop ===
==== Granite Ridge ====
AMD announced an initial lineup of four models of Ryzen 9000 processors on June 3, 2024, including one Ryzen 5, one Ryzen 7 and two Ryzen 9 models. Manufactured on a 4 nm process, the processors feature between 6 and 16 cores. Ryzen 9000 processors were released in August 2024.

In May 2025 four of these processors were also released in the 4005 range of the EPYC brand, with the 4585PX corresponding to the 9950X3D, the 4565P to the 9950X, the 4345P to the 9700X, and the 4245P to the 9600. Two EPYC 4005 parts, both 65W, have no direct Ryzen 9000 series equivalent: the EPYC 4465P with 12 cores at 3.4 GHz, and the 4545P with sixteen cores at 3.0 GHz.

In April 2026, AMD launches the Ryzen 9 9950X3D2 Dual Edition with a 200W TDP. This marks the return of 200W TDP in its consumer desktop CPU lineup for the first time since the 220W AMD FX-9590.

Common features of Ryzen 9000 desktop CPUs:

- Socket: AM5.
- All the CPUs support DDR5-5600 RAM in dual-channel mode in 2x1R and 2x2R configuration, but only DDR5-3600 for 4x1R and 4x2R.
- All the CPUs support 28 PCIe 5.0 lanes. 4 of the lanes are reserved as link to the chipset.
- Includes integrated RDNA 2 GPU with 2 CUs and base and boost clock speeds of 0.4 GHz and 2.2 GHz, respectively. Models with "F" suffixes are without iGPUs.
- L1 cache: 80 KB (48 KB data + 32 KB instruction) per core.
- L2 cache: 1 MB per core.
- Models with an "X3D" suffix include 2nd-generation 3D V-Cache in the form of a 64 MB cache die, which augments the L3 cache of one CCD.
- Models with an "X3D2" suffix or branded as "Dual Edition" include 2nd-generation 3D V-Cache in the form of two 64 MB cache dies (totaling to 128 MB), one die per CCD, which augment the L3 cache of their respective CCD.
- Fabrication process: TSMC N4X FinFET (N6 FinFET for the I/O die).

Branding and Model		Cores (threads)	Clock rate (GHz)		L3 cache (total)	TDP	Chiplets	Core config (Note: Core Complexes (CCX) × cores per CCX)	Thermal solution	Release date	Launch MSRP
Branding and Model		Cores (threads)	Base	Boost	L3 cache (total)	TDP	Chiplets	Core config	Thermal solution	Release date	Launch MSRP
Ryzen 9	9950X3D2 Dual Edition	16 (32)	4.3	5.6	192 MB (Note: Both CCXes have a 3D V-Cache.)	200 W	2 × CCD; 1 × I/OD	2 × 8	—N/a	April 22, 2026	US $899
Ryzen 9	9950X3D	16 (32)	4.3	5.7	128 MB (Note: Only one of the two CCXes has 3D V-Cache.)	170 W	2 × CCD; 1 × I/OD	2 × 8	—N/a	March 12, 2025	US $699
Ryzen 9	PRO 9965X3D	16 (32)	4.3	5.5	128 MB	170 W	2 × CCD; 1 × I/OD	2 × 8	—N/a	June 30, 2026	OEM
Ryzen 9	PRO 9965	16 (32)	4.3	5.5	64 MB	170 W	2 × CCD; 1 × I/OD	2 × 8	—N/a	June 30, 2026	OEM
Ryzen 9	9950X	16 (32)	4.3	5.7	64 MB	170 W	2 × CCD; 1 × I/OD	2 × 8	—N/a	August 15, 2024	US $649
Ryzen 9	PRO 9955	12 (24)	3.4	5.4	64 MB	120 W	2 × CCD; 1 × I/OD	2 × 6	—N/a	June 30, 2026	OEM
Ryzen 9	PRO 9945	12 (24)	3.4	5.4	64 MB	65 W	2 × CCD; 1 × I/OD	2 × 6	Wraith; Stealth	September 16, 2025	OEM
Ryzen 9	9900X3D	12 (24)	4.4	5.5	128 MB	120 W	2 × CCD; 1 × I/OD	2 × 6	—N/a	March 12, 2025	US $599
Ryzen 9	9900X	12 (24)	4.4	5.6	64 MB	120 W	2 × CCD; 1 × I/OD	2 × 6	—N/a	August 15, 2024	US $499
Ryzen 7	9850X3D	8 (16)	4.7	5.6	96 MB	120 W	1 × CCD; 1 × I/OD	1 × 8	—N/a	January 29, 2026	US $499
Ryzen 7	9800X3D (Note: Model also available as PRO version as PRO 9755X3D.)	8 (16)	4.7	5.2	96 MB	120 W	1 × CCD; 1 × I/OD	1 × 8	—N/a	November 7, 2024	US $479
Ryzen 7	PRO 9755	8 (16)	3.8	5.4	32 MB	120 W	1 × CCD; 1 × I/OD	1 × 8	—N/a	June 30, 2026	OEM
Ryzen 7	PRO 9745	8 (16)	3.8	5.4	32 MB	65 W	1 × CCD; 1 × I/OD	1 × 8	Wraith; Stealth	September 16, 2025	OEM
Ryzen 7	9700X	8 (16)	3.8	5.5	32 MB	65 W (Note: TDP configurable to 105 W)	1 × CCD; 1 × I/OD	1 × 8	—N/a	August 8, 2024	US $359
Ryzen 7	9700F	8 (16)	3.8	5.5	32 MB	65 W	1 × CCD; 1 × I/OD	1 × 8	—N/a	September 16, 2025	TBA
Ryzen 5	PRO 9655	6 (12)	3.9	5.4	32 MB	120 W	1 × CCD; 1 × I/OD	1 × 6	—N/a	June 30, 2026	OEM
Ryzen 5	9600X (Note: Model also available as PRO version as PRO 9645.)	6 (12)	3.9	5.4	32 MB	65 W	1 × CCD; 1 × I/OD	1 × 6	—N/a	August 8, 2024	US $279
Ryzen 5	9600	6 (12)	3.8	5.2	32 MB	65 W	1 × CCD; 1 × I/OD	1 × 6	Wraith; Stealth	February 19, 2025	TBA
Ryzen 5	9500F	6 (12)	3.8	5.0	32 MB	65 W	1 × CCD; 1 × I/OD	1 × 6	Wraith; Stealth	September 16, 2025	CN ¥1,299

==== Shimada Peak ====
AMD announced the Threadripper 9000 series of high-end desktop processors at Computex 2025, which released on July 30, 2025. These processors succeed the Zen 4 "Storm Peak" lineup and feature up to 96 Zen 5 cores. The processors come in two variants—the consumer "Threadripper" models and the more expensive workstation "Threadripper PRO" variants, which support more memory channels and PCIe lanes.

Common features of Ryzen 9000 HEDT/workstation CPUs:

- Socket: sTR5.
- Threadripper CPUs support DDR5-6400 in quad-channel mode while Threadripper PRO CPUs support DDR5-6400 in octa-channel mode with ECC support.
- L1 cache: 80 KB (48 KB data + 32 KB instruction) per core.
- L2 cache: 1 MB per core.
- Threadripper CPUs support 80 PCIe 5.0 lanes (4 of which runs PCIe 4.0 mode to the chipset; and remaining are usually running as 48 PCIe 5.0 lanes plus 24 PCIe 4.0 lanes), while Threadripper PRO CPUs support 128 PCIe 5.0 lanes (4 of which runs in PCIe 4.0 mode to the chipset), and extra 8 PCIe 3.0 lanes. Some lanes support alternative mode of running SATA3.
- No integrated graphics.
- Fabrication process: TSMC 4FFX.

Branding and model		Cores (threads)	Clock rate (GHz)		L3 cache (total)	TDP	Chiplets	Core config (Note: Core Complexes (CCXs) × cores per CCX)	Release date	MSRP
Branding and model		Cores (threads)	Base	Boost	L3 cache (total)	TDP	Chiplets	Core config	Release date	MSRP
Ryzen Threadripper PRO	9995WX	96 (192)	2.5	5.4	384 MB	350 W	12 × CCD; 1 × I/OD	12 × 8	July 2025	$11,699
Ryzen Threadripper PRO	9985WX	64 (128)	3.2	5.4	256 MB	350 W	8 × CCD; 1 × I/OD	8 × 8	July 2025	$7,999
Ryzen Threadripper PRO	9975WX	32 (64)	4.0	5.4	128 MB	350 W	4 × CCD; 1 × I/OD	4 × 8	July 2025	$4,099
Ryzen Threadripper PRO	9965WX	24 (48)	4.2	5.4	128 MB	350 W	4 × CCD; 1 × I/OD	4 × 6	July 2025	$2,899
Ryzen Threadripper PRO	9955WX	16 (32)	4.5	5.4	64 MB	350 W	2 × CCD; 1 × I/OD	2 × 8	July 2025	$1,649
Ryzen Threadripper PRO	9945WX	12 (24)	4.7	5.4	64 MB	350 W	2 × CCD; 1 × I/OD	2 × 6	July 2025	OEM
Ryzen Threadripper	9980X	64 (128)	3.2	5.4	256 MB	350 W	8 × CCD; 1 × I/OD	8 × 8	July 2025	$4,999
Ryzen Threadripper	9970X	32 (64)	4.0	5.4	128 MB	350 W	4 × CCD; 1 × I/OD	4 × 8	July 2025	$2,499
Ryzen Threadripper	9960X	24 (48)	4.2	5.4	128 MB	350 W	4 × CCD; 1 × I/OD	4 × 6	July 2025	$1,499

Threadripper 9000 processors officially support up to 6400 MT/s DDR5 memory, a significant increase from 5200 MT/s in the previous generation.

==== Gorgon Point AM5 ====
AMD announced an initial lineup of 6 models of Ryzen AI 400 processors on March 2, 2026, including two Ryzen 5 and one Ryzen 7 models. Manufactured on a 4 nm process, the processors feature between 6 and 8 cores. Common features of Ryzen AI 400 desktop APUs:

- Socket: AM5.
- All the CPUs support DDR5-5600 RAM in dual-channel mode in 2x1R and 2x2R configuration, but only DDR5-3600 for 4x1R and 4x2R.
- L1 cache: 80 KB per core.
- L2 cache: 1 MB per core.
- Includes integrated RDNA 3.5 GPU.
- Includes XDNA 2 AI Engine (Ryzen AI).
- Fabrication process: TSMC N4P FinFET.

Branding and model		CPU				GPU			NPU (Ryzen AI)	TDP	Release	MSRP
Branding and model		Cores (threads)	Clock rate (GHz)		L3 cache	GPU			NPU (Ryzen AI)	TDP	Release	MSRP
Branding and model		Cores (threads)	Base	Boost	L3 cache	Model	CUs	Clock (GHz)	NPU (Ryzen AI)	TDP	Release	MSRP
Ryzen AI 7	(PRO) 450G	8 (16)	2.0	5.1	16 MB	Radeon 860M	8	3.1	Up to 50 TOPS	65 W	March 2, 2026 (OEM)	OEM
Ryzen AI 7	(PRO) 450GE	8 (16)	2.0	5.1	16 MB	Radeon 860M	8	3.1	Up to 50 TOPS	35 W	March 2, 2026 (OEM)	OEM
Ryzen AI 5	(PRO) 440G	6 (12)	2.0	4.8	16 MB	Radeon 840M	4	2.9	Up to 50 TOPS	65 W	March 2, 2026 (OEM)	OEM
Ryzen AI 5	(PRO) 440GE	6 (12)	2.0	4.8	16 MB	Radeon 840M	4	2.9	Up to 50 TOPS	35 W	March 2, 2026 (OEM)	OEM
Ryzen AI 5	(PRO) 435G	6 (12)	2.0	4.5	8 MB	Radeon 840M	4	2.8	Up to 50 TOPS	65 W	March 2, 2026 (OEM)	OEM
Ryzen AI 5	(PRO) 435GE	6 (12)	2.0	4.5	8 MB	Radeon 840M	4	2.8	Up to 50 TOPS	35 W	March 2, 2026 (OEM)	OEM

=== Mobile ===
==== Strix Point & Krackan Point ====
The Ryzen AI 300 series of notebook processors was announced on June 3, 2024. Codenamed Strix Point (for the high performance Ryzen AI 9 300 series) & Krackan Point (for the mid-range Ryzen AI 5 and 7 300 series), these processors are named under a new model numbering system similar to Intel's Core and Core Ultra model numbering. Strix Point features a 3rd-gen Ryzen AI engine based on XDNA 2, providing up to 50 TOPS of neural processing unit performance. The integrated graphics is upgraded to RDNA 3.5, and top-end models have 16 CUs of GPU and 12 cores of CPU, an increase from the maximum of 8 CPU cores on previous-generation Ryzen ultra-thin mobile processors. Notebooks featuring Ryzen AI 300 series processors were released on July 17, 2024.

Common features of Ryzen AI 300 notebook APUs:

- Socket: BGA, FP8 package type.
- All models support DDR5-5600 or LPDDR5X-8000 in dual-channel mode.
- All models support 16 PCIe 4.0 lanes.
- Native USB 40Gbps (USB4) Ports: 2
- Native USB 10Gbps (USB 3.2 Gen 2 operation mode) Ports: 2
- iGPU uses the RDNA 3.5 microarchitecture.
- NPU uses the XDNA 2 AI Engine (Ryzen AI).
- Both Zen 5 and Zen 5c cores support AVX-512 using a half-width 256-bit FPU.
- L1 cache: 80 KB (48 KB data + 32 KB instruction) per core.
- L2 cache: 1 MB per core.
- Fabrication process: TSMC N4P FinFET.

Branding and model		CPU							GPU		NPU (Ryzen AI)	TDP (cTDP)	Release date
Branding and model		Cores (threads)			Clock (GHz)			L3 cache (total)	Model	Clock (GHz)	NPU (Ryzen AI)	TDP (cTDP)	Release date
Branding and model		Total	Zen 5	Zen 5c	Base	Boost (Zen 5)	Boost (Zen 5c)	L3 cache (total)	Model	Clock (GHz)	NPU (Ryzen AI)	TDP (cTDP)	Release date
Ryzen AI 9	(PRO) HX 375	12 (24)	4 (8)	8 (16)	2.0	5.1	3.3	24 MB	890M; 16 CUs	2.9	55 TOPS	28 W (15−54 W)	June 2, 2024
Ryzen AI 9	(PRO) HX 370	12 (24)	4 (8)	8 (16)	2.0	5.1	3.3	24 MB	890M; 16 CUs	2.9	50 TOPS	28 W (15−54 W)	June 2, 2024
Ryzen AI 9	365	10 (20)	4 (8)	6 (12)	2.0	5.0	3.3	24 MB	880M; 12 CUs	2.9	50 TOPS	28 W (15−54 W)	June 2, 2024
Ryzen AI 7	PRO 360	8 (16)	3 (6)	5 (10)	2.0	5.0	3.3	16 MB	880M; 12 CUs	2.9	50 TOPS	28 W (15−54 W)	October 10, 2024
Ryzen AI 7	(PRO) 350	8 (16)	4 (8)	4 (8)	2.0	5.0	3.5	16 MB	860M; 8 CU	3.0	50 TOPS	28 W (15−54 W)	(March 27, 2025) February 18, 2025
Ryzen AI 5	(PRO) 340	6 (12)	3 (6)	3 (6)	2.0	4.8	3.4	16 MB	840M; 4 CU	2.9	50 TOPS	28 W (15−54 W)	(March 27, 2025) February 18, 2025
Ryzen AI 5	330	4 (8)	1 (2)	3 (6)	2.0	4.5	3.4	8 MB	820M; 2 CU	2.8	50 TOPS	28 W (15−28 W)	July 2025

==== Gorgon Point ====
Common features of Ryzen AI 400 notebook APUs:

- Socket: BGA, FP8 package type.
- All models support DDR5-5600 or LPDDR5X-8000 (LPDDR5X-8533 for 440, 450, 465, 470, 475 series) in dual-channel mode.
- All models support 16 PCIe 4.0 lanes.
- Native USB 40Gbps (USB4) Ports: 2
- Native USB 10Gbps (USB 3.2 Gen 2 operation mode) Ports: 2
- iGPU uses the RDNA 3.5 microarchitecture.
- NPU uses the XDNA 2 AI Engine (Ryzen AI).
- Both Zen 5 and Zen 5c cores support AVX-512 using a half-width 256-bit FPU.
- L1 cache: 80 KB (48 KB data + 32 KB instruction) per core.
- L2 cache: 1 MB per core.
- Fabrication process: TSMC N4P FinFET.

Branding and model		CPU							GPU		NPU (Ryzen AI)	TDP	Release date
Branding and model		Cores (threads)			Clock (GHz)			L3 cache (total)	Model	Clock (GHz)	NPU (Ryzen AI)	TDP	Release date
Branding and model		Total	Zen 5	Zen 5c	Base	Boost (Zen 5)	Boost (Zen 5c)	L3 cache (total)	Model	Clock (GHz)	NPU (Ryzen AI)	TDP	Release date
Ryzen AI 9	(PRO) HX 475	12 (24)	4 (8)	8 (16)	2.0	5.2	3.3	24 MB	890M; 16 CUs	3.1	60 TOPS	15–54 W	January 5, 2026
Ryzen AI 9	(PRO) HX 470	12 (24)	4 (8)	8 (16)	2.0	5.2	3.3	24 MB	890M; 16 CUs	3.1	55 TOPS	15–54 W	January 5, 2026
Ryzen AI 9	(PRO) 465 (Note: Model also available as "H" version as H 430, H 435, H PRO 435, H PRO 440, H 445, H PRO 445, H 450, H PRO 450, H 465, and H PRO 465, but lacks support for AMD EXPO and FreeSync technologies.)	10 (20)	4 (8)	6 (12)	2.0	5.0	3.3	24 MB	880M; 12 CUs	2.9	50 TOPS	15–54 W	January 5, 2026
Ryzen AI 7	(PRO) 450	8 (16)	4 (8)	4 (8)	2.0	5.1	3.6	16 MB	860M; 8 CUs	3.1	50 TOPS	15–54 W	January 5, 2026
Ryzen AI 7	445	6 (12)	2 (4)	4 (8)	2.0	4.6	3.5	8 MB	840M; 4 CUs	2.9	50 TOPS	15–54 W	January 5, 2026
Ryzen AI 5	PRO 440	6 (12)	3 (6)	3 (6)	2.0	4.8	3.5	16 MB	840M; 4 CUs	2.9	50 TOPS	15–54 W	January 5, 2026
Ryzen AI 5	(PRO) 435	6 (12)	2 (4)	4 (8)	2.0	4.5	3.4	8 MB	840M; 4 CUs	2.8	50 TOPS	15–54 W	January 5, 2026
Ryzen AI 5	430	4 (8)	1 (2)	3 (6)	2.0	4.5	3.4	8 MB	840M; 4 CUs	2.8	50 TOPS	15–28 W	January 5, 2026

==== Strix Halo ====
Strix Halo represented a major departure of previous multi-chiplet mobile processors. Strix Halo's CCD is actually not the same type of CCD used on regular Zen 5 desktop processors. Instead it features a unique "sea of wires" interconnect that replaces the previous infinity fabric. This change allowed for greater power efficiency but also greater design complexity. This type of interconnect is rumored to be on Zen 6, the next generation of AMD CPU microarchitecture.

Common features of Strix Halo mobile CPUs:

- Socket: BGA, FP11 package type.
- All CPUs only support soldered LPDDR5X memory with a 256-bit memory bus.
- All CPUs support 16 PCIe 4.0 lanes.
- Native USB 40Gbps (USB4) Ports: 2
- Native USB 10Gbps (USB 3.2 Gen 2 operation mode) Ports: 3
- NVMe Support: Boot, RAID0, RAID1
- iGPU uses the RDNA 3.5 microarchitecture.
- NPU uses the XDNA 2 AI Engine (Ryzen AI).
- Zen 5 cores support AVX-512 using a full-width 512-bit FPU.
- L2 cache: 1 MB per core.
- Fabrication process: TSMC N4P FinFET.

Branding and Model		CPU				GPU		Memory			NPU (Ryzen AI)	Chiplets	Core config	TDP	Release date
Branding and Model		Cores (threads)	Clock (GHz)		L3 cache (total)	Model	Clock (GHz)	Bus type & width (Max memory)	Clock (MT/s)	Bandwidth (GB/s)	NPU (Ryzen AI)	Chiplets	Core config	TDP	Release date
Branding and Model		Cores (threads)	Base	Boost	L3 cache (total)	Model	Clock (GHz)	Bus type & width (Max memory)	Clock (MT/s)	Bandwidth (GB/s)	NPU (Ryzen AI)	Chiplets	Core config	TDP	Release date
Ryzen AI MAX+	(PRO) 395	16 (32)	3.0	5.1	64 MB	8060S; 40 CUs	2.9	LPDDR5X; 256-bit (128 GB)	Up to 8000	Up to 256	50 TOPS	2 × CCD; 1 × I/OD with GPU	2 × 8	45–120 W	Q1 2025
Ryzen AI MAX+	392	12 (24)	3.2	5.0	64 MB	8060S; 40 CUs	2.9	LPDDR5X; 256-bit (128 GB)	Up to 8000	Up to 256	50 TOPS	2 × CCD; 1 × I/OD with GPU	2 × 6	45–120 W	Q1 2026
Ryzen AI MAX	(PRO) 390	12 (24)	3.2	5.0	64 MB	8050S; 32 CUs	2.8	LPDDR5X; 256-bit (128 GB)	Up to 8000	Up to 256	50 TOPS	2 × CCD; 1 × I/OD with GPU	2 × 6	45–120 W	Q1 2025
Ryzen AI MAX+	388	8 (16)	3.6	5.0	32 MB	8060S; 40 CUs	2.9	LPDDR5X; 256-bit (128 GB)	Up to 8000	Up to 256	50 TOPS	1 × CCD; 1 × I/OD with GPU	1 × 8	45–120 W	Q1 2026
Ryzen AI MAX	(PRO) 385	8 (16)	3.6	5.0	32 MB	8050S; 32 CUs	2.8	LPDDR5X; 256-bit (128 GB)	Up to 8000	Up to 256	50 TOPS	1 × CCD; 1 × I/OD with GPU	1 × 8	45–120 W	Q1 2025
Ryzen AI MAX	PRO 380	6 (12)	3.6	4.9	16 MB	8040S; 16 CUs	2.8	LPDDR5X; 128-bit (64 GB)	Up to 8000	Up to 128	50 TOPS	1 × CCD; 1 × I/OD with GPU	1 × 6	45–120 W	Q1 2025

==== Gorgon Halo ====
Common features of Ryzen AI Max PRO 400 notebook APUs:

- Socket: BGA, FP11 package type.
- All CPUs only support soldered LPDDR5X memory with a 256-bit memory bus.
- All CPUs support 16 PCIe 4.0 lanes.
- Native USB 40Gbps (USB4) Ports: 2
- Native USB 10Gbps (USB 3.2 Gen 2 operation mode) Ports: 3
- NVMe Support: Boot, RAID0, RAID1
- iGPU uses the RDNA 3.5 microarchitecture.
- NPU uses the XDNA 2 AI Engine (Ryzen AI).
- Zen 5 cores support AVX-512 using a full-width 512-bit FPU.
- L2 cache: 1 MB per core.
- Fabrication process: TSMC N4P FinFET.

Branding and Model		CPU				GPU		Memory			NPU (Ryzen AI)	Chiplets	Core config	TDP	Release date
Branding and Model		Cores (threads)	Clock (GHz)		L3 cache (total)	Model	Clock (GHz)	Bus type & width (Max memory)	Clock (MT/s)	Bandwidth (GB/s)	NPU (Ryzen AI)	Chiplets	Core config	TDP	Release date
Branding and Model		Cores (threads)	Base	Boost	L3 cache (total)	Model	Clock (GHz)	Bus type & width (Max memory)	Clock (MT/s)	Bandwidth (GB/s)	NPU (Ryzen AI)	Chiplets	Core config	TDP	Release date
Ryzen AI MAX+	PRO 495	16 (32)	3.1	5.2	64 MB	8065S; 40 CUs	3.0	LPDDR5X; 256-bit (192 GB)	Up to 8533	Up to 273	55 TOPS	2 × CCD; 1 × I/OD with GPU	2 × 8	55W cTDP: 45–120 W	Q3 2026
Ryzen AI MAX	PRO 490	12 (24)	3.2	5.0	64 MB	8050S; 32 CUs	2.8	LPDDR5X; 256-bit (192 GB)	Up to 8533	Up to 273	50 TOPS	2 × CCD; 1 × I/OD with GPU	2 × 6	55W cTDP: 45–120 W	Q3 2026
Ryzen AI MAX	PRO 485	8 (16)	3.6	5.0	32 MB	8050S; 32 CUs	2.8	LPDDR5X; 256-bit (192 GB)	Up to 8533	Up to 273	50 TOPS	1 × CCD; 1 × I/OD with GPU	1 × 8	55W cTDP: 45–120 W	Q3 2026

==== Fire Range ====
Common features of Ryzen 9000 Fire Range series:

- Socket: FL1.
- All models support dual-channel DDR5-5600 with a maximum capacity of 96 GB.
- All models support 28 PCIe 5.0 lanes.
- Native USB 3.2 Gen 2 (10 Gbps): 4.
- Native USB 2.0 (480 Mbps): 1.
- iGPU: AMD Radeon 610M (2 CU @ 2200 MHz).
- No NPU.
- Fabrication process: TSMC N4 FinFET (CCD) + TSMC N6 FinFET (I/OD).

Branding and Model		Cores (threads)	Clock (GHz)		L3 cache (total)	Chiplets	Core config	TDP	Release date
Branding and Model		Cores (threads)	Base	Boost	L3 cache (total)	Chiplets	Core config	TDP	Release date
Ryzen 9	9955HX3D	16 (32)	2.3	5.4	128 MB	2 × CCD; 1 × I/OD	2 × 8	54 W	1H 2025
Ryzen 9	9955HX	16 (32)	2.5	5.4	64 MB	2 × CCD; 1 × I/OD	2 × 8	54 W	1H 2025
Ryzen 9	9850HX	12 (24)	3.0	5.2	64 MB	2 × CCD; 1 × I/OD	2 × 6	54 W	1H 2025

=== Server ===
==== Turin ====
Alongside Granite Ridge desktop and Strix Point mobile processors, the Epyc 9005 series of high-performance server processors, codenamed Turin, were also announced at Computex on June 3, 2024. It uses the same SP5 socket as the previous Epyc 9004 series processors, and packs up to 128 cores and 256 threads on the top-end model. Turin is built on a TSMC 4 nm process. Common features of EPYC 9005 server processors:

- Socket: SP5.
- The CPUs support up to DDR5-6400 in 12 channel mode.
- Fabrication process: TSMC N4X.

Branding and Model		Cores (threads)	Clock rate (GHz)		L3 cache (total)	TDP	Chiplets	Core config (Note: Core Complexes (CCX) × cores per CCX)	Release date	Launch price (Note: Manufacturer suggested retail price at launch)
Branding and Model		Cores (threads)	Base	Boost	L3 cache (total)	TDP	Chiplets	Core config	Release date	Launch price
Epyc	9755	128 (256)	2.7	4.1	512 MB	500 W	16 × CCD; 1 × I/OD	16 × 8	October 10, 2024	US $12,984
Epyc	9655P	96 (192)	2.6	4.5	384 MB	400 W	12 × CCD; 1 × I/OD	12 × 8	October 10, 2024	US $10,811
Epyc	9655	96 (192)	2.6	4.5	384 MB	400 W	12 × CCD; 1 × I/OD	12 × 8	October 10, 2024	US $11,852
Epyc	9565	72 (144)	3.15	4.3	384 MB	400 W	12 × CCD; 1 × I/OD	12 × 6	October 10, 2024	US $10,486
Epyc	9575F	64 (128)	3.3	5.0	256 MB	400 W	8 × CCD; 1 × I/OD	8 × 8	October 10, 2024	US $11,791
Epyc	9555P	64 (128)	3.2	4.4	256 MB	360 W	8 × CCD; 1 × I/OD	8 × 8	October 10, 2024	US $7,983
Epyc	9555	64 (128)	3.2	4.4	256 MB	360 W	8 × CCD; 1 × I/OD	8 × 8	October 10, 2024	US $9,826
Epyc	9535	64 (128)	2.4	4.3	256 MB	300 W	8 × CCD; 1 × I/OD	8 × 8	October 10, 2024	US $8,992
Epyc	9475F	48 (96)	3.65	4.8	256 MB	400 W	8 × CCD; 1 × I/OD	8 × 6	October 10, 2024	US $7,592
Epyc	9455P	48 (96)	3.15	4.4	256 MB	300 W	8 × CCD; 1 × I/OD	8 × 6	October 10, 2024	US $4,819
Epyc	9455	48 (96)	3.15	4.4	256 MB	300 W	8 × CCD; 1 × I/OD	8 × 6	October 10, 2024	US $5,412
Epyc	9365	36 (72)	3.4	4.3	192 MB	300 W	6 × CCD; 1 × I/OD	6 × 6	October 10, 2024	US $4,341
Epyc	9375F	32 (64)	3.8	4.8	256 MB	320 W	8 × CCD; 1 × I/OD	8 × 4	October 10, 2024	US $5,306
Epyc	9355P	32 (64)	3.55	4.4	256 MB	280 W	8 × CCD; 1 × I/OD	8 × 4	October 10, 2024	US $2,998
Epyc	9355	32 (64)	3.55	4.4	256 MB	280 W	8 × CCD; 1 × I/OD	8 × 4	October 10, 2024	US $3,694
Epyc	9335	32 (64)	3.0	4.4	128 MB	210 W	4 × CCD; 1 × I/OD	4 × 8	October 10, 2024	US $3,178
Epyc	9275F	24 (48)	4.1	4.8	256 MB	320 W	8 × CCD; 1 × I/OD	8 × 3	October 10, 2024	US $3,439
Epyc	9255	24 (48)	3.25	4.3	128 MB	200 W	4 × CCD; 1 × I/OD	4 × 6	October 10, 2024	US $2,495
Epyc	9175F	16 (32)	4.2	5.0	512 MB	320 W	16 × CCD; 1 × I/OD	16 × 1	October 10, 2024	US $4,256
Epyc	9135	16 (32)	3.65	4.3	64 MB	200 W	2 × CCD; 1 × I/OD	2 × 8	October 10, 2024	US $1,214
Epyc	9115	16 (32)	2.6	4.1	64 MB	125 W	2 × CCD; 1 × I/OD	2 × 8	October 10, 2024	US $726
Epyc	9015	8 (16)	3.6	4.1	64 MB	125 W	2 × CCD; 1 × I/OD	2 × 4	October 10, 2024	US $527

==== Turin Dense ====
A variant of Epyc 9005 using Zen 5c ("Prometheus") cores was also shown off at Computex. It features a maximum of 192 cores and 384 threads, and is manufactured on a 3 nm process. Common features of EPYC Dense 9000 server processers:

- Socket: SP5.
- All the CPUs support DDR5-6400 in 12 channel mode.
- Fabrication process: TSMC N3E.

Branding and Model		Cores (threads)	Clock rate (GHz)		L3 cache (total)	TDP	Chiplets	Core config (Note: Core Complexes (CCX) × cores per CCX)	Release date	Launch price (Note: Manufacturer suggested retail price at launch)
Branding and Model		Cores (threads)	Base	Boost	L3 cache (total)	TDP	Chiplets	Core config	Release date	Launch price
Epyc	9965	192 (384)	2.25	3.7	384 MB	500 W	12 × CCD; 1 × I/OD	12 × 16	October 10, 2024	US $14,813
Epyc	9845	160 (320)	2.1	3.7	320 MB	390 W	10 × CCD; 1 × I/OD	10 × 16	October 10, 2024	US $13,564
Epyc	9825	144 (288)	2.2	3.7	384 MB	390 W	12 × CCD; 1 × I/OD	12 × 12	October 10, 2024	US $13,006
Epyc	9745	128 (256)	2.4	3.7	256 MB	400 W	8 × CCD; 1 × I/OD	8 × 16	October 10, 2024	US $12,141
Epyc	9645	96 (192)	2.3	3.7	256 MB	320 W	8 × CCD; 1 × I/OD	8 × 12	October 10, 2024	US $11,048

== Zen 5c ==
Zen 5c ("Prometheus") is a compact variant of the Zen 5 ("Nirvana") core, primarily targeted at hyperscale cloud compute server customers. It succeeds the Zen 4c ("Dionysus") core.

== See also ==
- Arrow Lake - a competing x86 CPU lineup from Intel for Granite Ridge, Fire Range, and the Ryzen AI 300 series
- Lunar Lake - a competing mobile x86 CPU lineup for Ryzen AI 300 series
- Panther Lake - a competing x86 CPU lineup for the Ryzen AI 300 and 400 series
- Granite Rapids - a competing x86 CPU lineup for Turin Classic
- Sierra Forest - a competing x86 CPU lineup for Turin Dense
- RTX Spark - a competing ARM CPU lineup from Nvidia for the Ryzen AI MAX series

Turion / ULV		Node range label	x86			
Microarchi.	Step	Node range label	Microarchi.	Step		
		180 nm	K7	Athlon Classic		
		180 nm	K7	Thunderbird		
		180 nm	K7	Palomino		
		130 nm	K7	Thoroughbred		
		130 nm	K7	Barton/Thorton		
		130 nm	K8	ClawHammer		
		130 nm	K8	Newcastle		
		130 nm	K8	SledgeHammer		
K8L	Lancaster	90 nm	K8	Winchester	K8(×2)	K9
K8L	Richmond	90 nm	K8	San Diego	Toledo	~~Greyhound~~
K8L	Taylor / Trinidad	90 nm	K8	San Diego	Windsor	
K8L	Tyler	65 nm	K8	Orleans	Brisbane	
K8L	Lion	65 nm	K10	Phenom	4 cores on mainstream desktop, DDR3 introduced	
K8L	Caspian	45 nm	K10	Phenom II / Athlon II	6 cores on mainstream desktop	
14h	Bobcat	40 nm				
		32 nm	K10	Lynx		
		32 nm	K10	Llano	APU introduced; CPU and GPU on single die	
		32 nm	Bulldozer 15h	Bulldozer	8 cores on mainstream desktop	
		32 nm	Bulldozer 15h	Piledriver		
16h	Jaguar	28 nm	Bulldozer 15h	Steamroller	APU/mobile-only	
16h	Puma	28 nm	Bulldozer 15h	Excavator	APU/mobile-only, DDR4 introduced	
K12	~~K12 (ARM64)~~	14 nm	Zen	Zen	SMT introduced	
		12 nm	Zen	Zen+		
		7 nm	Zen	Zen 2	12 and 16 cores on mainstream desktop, chiplet design	
		7 nm	Zen	Zen 3	3D V-Cache variants introduced	
		6 nm	Zen	Zen 3+	Mobile-only, DDR5 introduced	
		5 nm / 4 nm	Zen	Zen 4	High core density "Cloud" (Zen xc) variants introduced	
		4 nm / 3 nm	Zen	Zen 5	Ryzen AI NPU cores introduced	
		3 nm / 2 nm	Zen	Zen 6		
		16A / 14A	Zen	Zen 7		
