= Krste Asanović =

American computer engineer

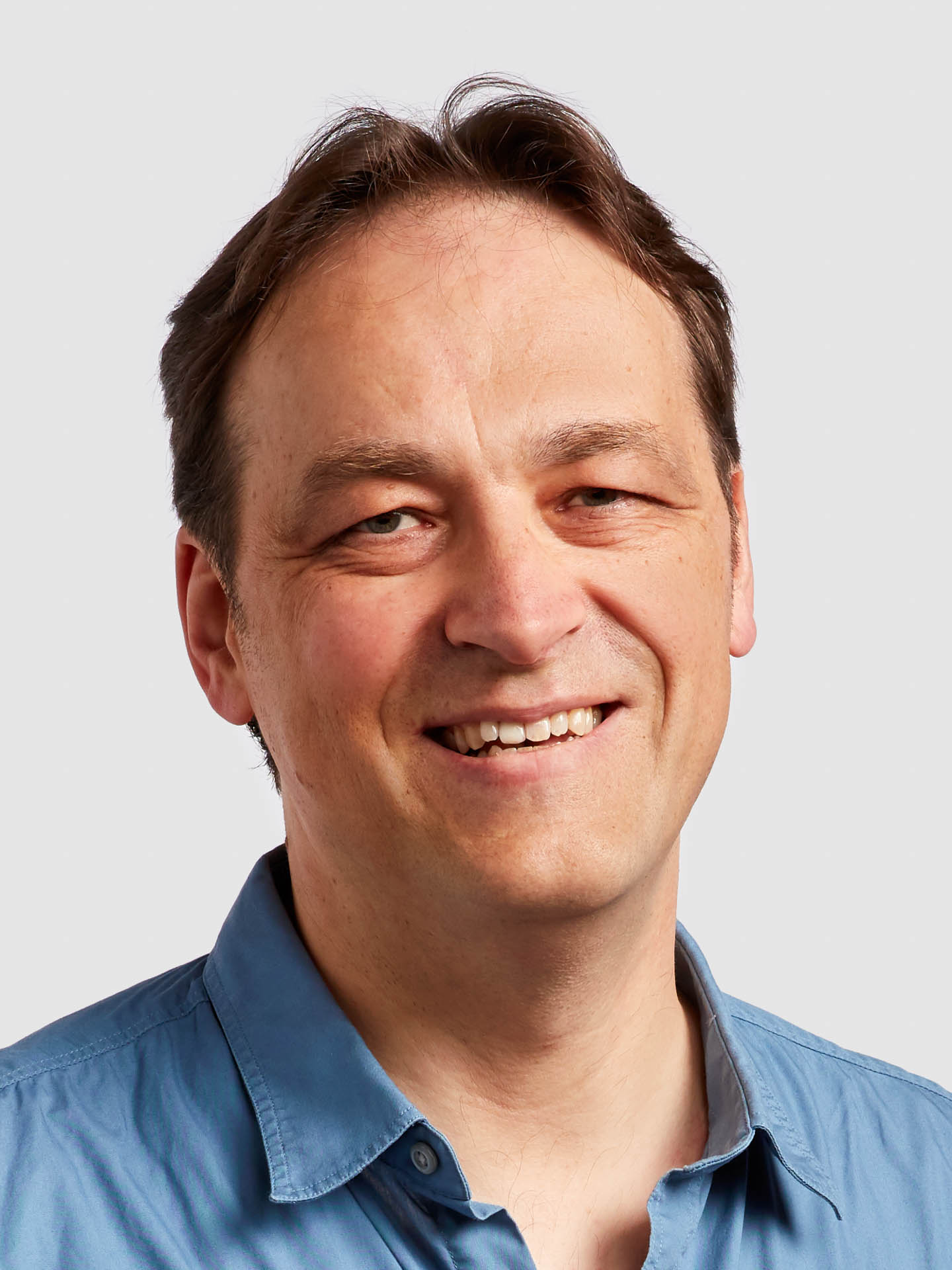
- Asanovic in 2018
- Known for: Co-founder, SiFive

Academic background
- Education: University of California, Berkeley
- Thesis: Vector Microprocessors (1998)
- Doctoral advisor: John Wawrzynek

Academic work
- Discipline: Computer architecture

Krste Asanović (born 17 June 1965) is an engineering academic from the University of California, Berkeley. He has written and co-authored many academic papers concerning computer architecture. As of 2023, he is chairman of the Board of the RISC-V Foundation.

Asanović was named Fellow of the Institute of Electrical and Electronics Engineers (IEEE) in 2014 for contributions to computer architecture. He was elected as an ACM Fellow in 2018 for "contributions to computer architecture, including the open RISC-V instruction set and Agile hardware".

Asanović received a PhD in computer science from Berkeley in 1998 under John Wawrzynek. In 2015, along with RISC-V researchers he co-founded SiFive, a fabless semiconductor company and provider of commercial RISC-V processor IP, where he serves as its chief architect.
