= 3960X =

3960X may refer to:

- AMD Ryzen Threadripper 3960X, computer processor released in 2019
- Intel Core i7-3960X, computer processor released in 2011
