= AM5 =

AM5 may refer to:

- Socket AM5, a CPU socket for AMD processors
- Sega AM5, a video-game development studio
