= 3970X =

3970X may refer to:

- AMD Ryzen Threadripper 3970X, computer processor released in 2019
- Intel Core i7-3970X, computer processor released in 2012
