= UCIe =

Universal Chiplet Interconnect express

Universal Chiplet Interconnect Express (UCIe) is an open specification for a die-to-die interconnect and serial bus between chiplets. It is co-developed by AMD, Arm, ASE Group, Google Cloud, Intel, Meta, Microsoft, Qualcomm, Samsung, and TSMC.

In August 2022, Alibaba Group and Nvidia joined as board members.

== Overview ==
A common chiplet interconnect specification enables construction of large system-on-chip (SoC) packages that exceed maximum reticle size. It allows intermixing components from different silicon vendors within the same package and improves manufacturing yields by using smaller dies. Each chiplet can use a different silicon manufacturing process, suitable for a specific device type, or computing performance and power draw requirements.

== Specifications ==
=== 1.0 ===
The UCIe 1.0 specification was released on March 2, 2022. It defines physical layer, protocol stack and software model, as well as procedures for compliance testing. The physical layer supports up to 32 GT/s with 16 to 64 lanes and uses a 256 byte Flow Control Unit (FLIT) for data, similar to PCIe 6.0; the protocol layer is based on Compute Express Link with CXL.io (PCIe), CXL.mem and CXL.cache protocols.

Various on-die interconnect technologies are defined, like organic substrate for a 'standard' 2D package, or embedded silicon bridge (EMIB), silicon interposer, and fanout embedded bridge for 'advanced' 2.5D/3D packages. Physical specifications are based on Intel's Advanced Interface Bus (AIB).

Shorter signal paths allow the links to have 20× better I/O performance and power consumption (~0.5 pJ per bit) comparing to typical PCIe SerDes, with bandwidth density up to 1.35 TB/s per mm^{2} for a common bump pitch of 45 μm, and 3.24× higher density with a bump pitch of 25 μm.

Future versions may include additional protocols, wider data links, and higher density connections.

==== 1.1 ====
The UCIe 1.1 specification was released on August 8, 2023.

Highlights:

- Architectural Specification Enhancements enable compliance testing
- Supports simultaneous multiprotocol with full link layer functionality for streaming protocols
- Includes runtime health monitoring and repair for automotive and high-reliability applications
- New bump maps result in lower cost packaging

=== 2.0 ===
The UCIe 2.0 specification was released on August 6, 2024.

Highlights:

- Holistic support for manageability, debug, and testing for any System-in-Package (SiP) construction with multiple chiplets.
- Support for 3D packaging to significantly enhance bandwidth density and power efficiency.
- Improved system-level solutions with manageability defined as part of the chiplet stack.
- Optimized package designs for interoperability and compliance testing.
- Fully backward compatible with UCIe 1.x

=== 3.0 ===
The UCIe 3.0 specification was released on August 5, 2025.

Highlights:

- Support for 48 GT/s and 64 GT/s data rates
- Runtime recalibration enhancements
- Extended sideband channel reaching up to 100mm
- Support for continuous transmission protocols
- Early firmware download standardization
- Priority sideband packets allow deterministic and low-latency signaling
- Fast throttle and emergency shutdown mechanisms
- Fully backward compatible with all previous UCIe specifications

=== 4.0 ===
The UCIe 4.0 specification was released on November 12, 2026.

Highlights:

- Standardized connectivity between SoCs and memory logic dies
- Co-Optimized link profiles
- Enhanced security capabilities
- System-level manageability
- Optional error notifications and link-health monitors
- Fully backward compatible with all previous UCIe specifications
