= Socket AM4 =

CPU socket for AMD processors with Zen and Excavator architectures

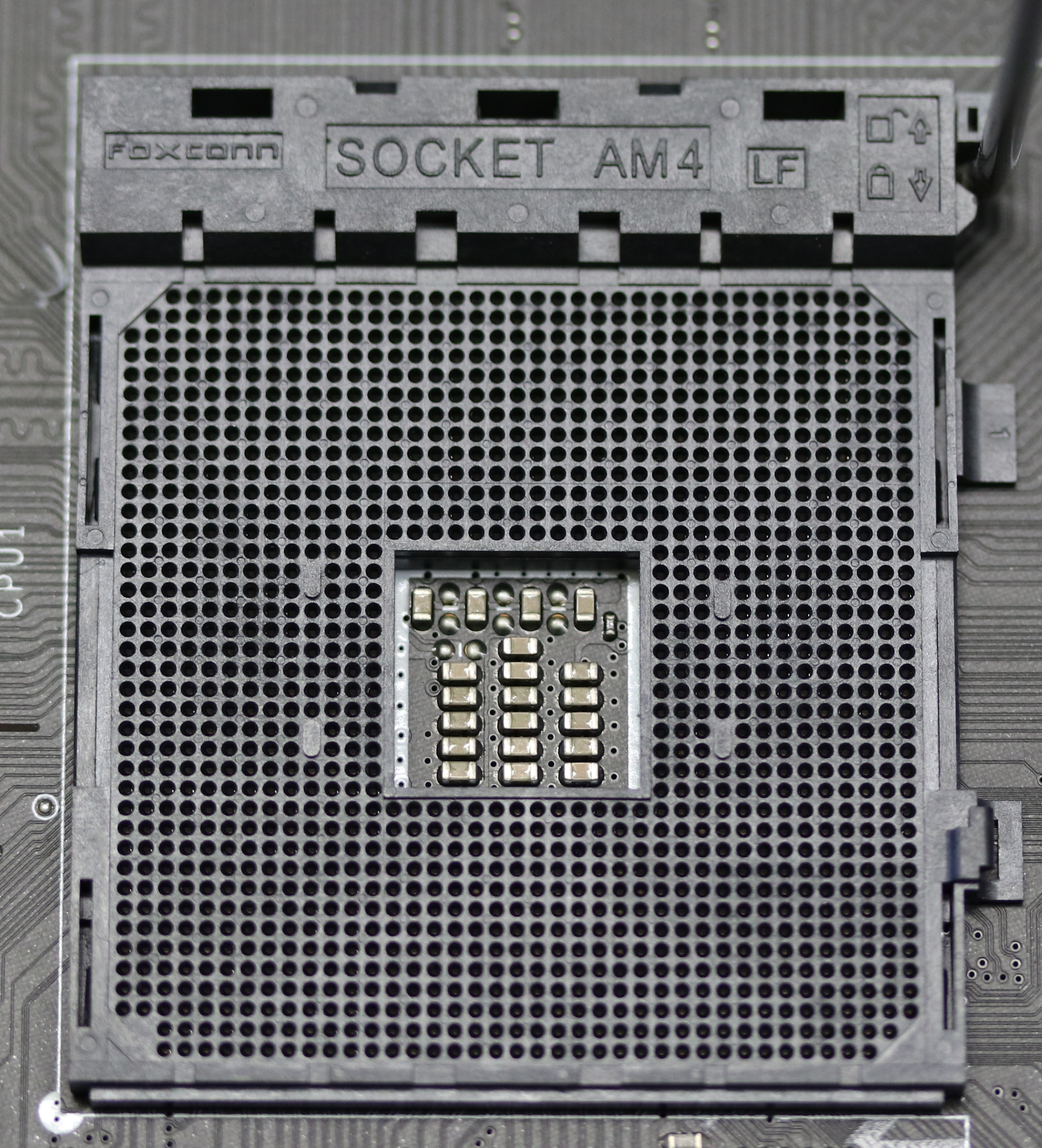
- Release date: September 2016
- Designed by: AMD
- Manufactured by: Lotes, Foxconn
- Type: μOPGA-ZIF
- Chip form factors: Flip-chip
- Contacts: 1331
- FSB protocol: Infinity Fabric, PCI Express
- Voltage range: 1.3V
- Processor dimensions: 40 mm × 40 mm 1,600 mm²
- Processors: Ryzen: Summit Ridge; Pinnacle Ridge; Raven Ridge; Matisse; Picasso; Renoir; Vermeer; Cezanne; Athlon: Raven Ridge; Picasso; A-Series, Athlon X4: Bristol Ridge
- Predecessor: AM3+, FM2+, AM1
- Successor: AM5
- Memory support: DDR4
- This article is part of the CPU socket series

Socket AM4 is a PGA microprocessor socket used by AMD's central processing units (CPUs) built on the Zen (including Zen+, Zen 2 and Zen 3) and Excavator microarchitectures.

AM4 was launched in September 2016 and was designed to replace the sockets AM3+, FM2+ and FS1b as a single platform. It has 1331 pin slots and is the first from AMD to support DDR4 memory as well as achieve unified compatibility between high-end CPUs (previously using Socket AM3+) and AMD's lower-end APUs (on various other sockets). In 2017, AMD made a commitment to using the AM4 platform with socket 1331 until 2020. AM5 succeeded the AM4 platform in late 2022 with the introduction of the Ryzen 7000 series, but, nonetheless, AMD has continued to release new CPUs for AM4 even after the release of AM5.

== Features ==
The X370 chipset supports multiple graphics cards. But the number of available PCIe lanes depends on the CPU/APU.

- Support for Zen (including Zen+, Zen 2 and Zen 3) based family of CPUs and APUs (Ryzen, Athlon), as well as for some A-Series APUs and Athlon X4 CPUs (Bristol Ridge based on the Excavator microarchitecture)
- Supports PCIe 3.0 and PCIe 4.0: x16 (GPU) + x4 (M.2) + x4 (UMI)
- Supports up to 4 modules of DDR4 RAM in dual-channel configuration

== Heatsink ==
The AM4 socket specifies the four holes for fastening the heatsink to the motherboard to be placed in the corners of a rectangle with a lateral length of 54×90 mm. Previous sockets have 48×96 mm.

Some heat sinks for older sockets are not compatible. Some cooler manufacturers, however, are reported to be offering brackets allowing previously manufactured coolers to work with AM4, while other coolers will be redesigned. Alternatively, some motherboard makers are including both AM3 and AM4 cooler mounting holes, allowing previous generation coolers to be used. AM4 coolers that use a two-pronged bracket approach (such as the AMD Wraith Prism) to mount the cooler will work with AM4 and all the way back to Socket 754/939.

== Chipsets ==
Socket AM4 is currently a base for 8 chipset models. While the processors for this socket have been designed as systems in a package (SiP), with the traditional northbridge and southbridge on board the processor, the motherboard chipset will increase the number of PCI Express lanes and other connectivity options. These connectivity options include: NVMe, SATA, and USB 3.2 Gen 2. There also exists chipset-less variations of A320 and X370, called A300 and X300 respectively, that rely solely on the I/O die integrated into the CPU; these platforms are designed solely for small form factor (SFF) systems where there is a possibility that there is not enough space on the board to fit an actual chipset; these 'chipsets' are also solely available for OEM use only and are not available for purchase with SFF boards.

Model	Release date	PCIe support (Note: PCIe lanes provided by the chipset. The CPU provides other PCIe 3.0 or 4.0 lanes.)	Multi-GPU		USB support (Note: USB 3.2 Gen 2x1 10Gb/s, USB 3.2 Gen 1x1 5Gb/s, USB 2.0)	Storage features			Processor overclocking	TDP	CPU support					ECC memory	Architecture	Part number
Model	Release date	PCIe support	CrossFire	SLI	USB support	SATA ports	RAID	AMD StoreMI	Processor overclocking	TDP	Excavator	Zen	Zen+	Zen 2	Zen 3	ECC memory	Architecture	Part number
A300	Feb 2017	None	N/A		None	None	Yes	No	No	~120 μW (Note: Knoll chipsets consume "insignificant power ...after [boot] in sleep mode", power figure based on a typical SPI controller)	No	Yes				No	Knoll Express	100-CG2978 218-0892000 KNOLL1
X300	Feb 2017	None	N/A		None	None	Yes	No	Yes	~120 μW	No	Yes				No	Knoll Express	unknown
Pro 500	Jan 2020	None	N/A		None	None	Unknown		No	~120 μW	No	Partial (Note: Limited to specific SKUs branded as Ryzen Pro and Athlon Pro)				No	Knoll Express	218-0891003 unreleased
A320	Feb 2017	PCIe 2.0 ×4	No	No	1, 2, 6	4	0, 1, 10	No	Limited (Note: Only pre-Zen CPUs can be overclocked.)	~5.8 W	Yes	Yes	Yes	Varies (Note: BIOS update needed. Availability may depend on manufacturer.)		No	Promontory	218-0891004
B350	Feb 2017	PCIe 2.0 ×6	Yes	No	2, 2, 6	4	0, 1, 10	No	Yes	~5.8 W	Yes	Yes	Yes	Varies		No	Promontory	218-0891005
X370	Feb 2017	PCIe 2.0 ×8	Yes	Yes	2, 6, 6	8	0, 1, 10	No	Yes	~5.8 W	Yes	Yes	Yes	Varies		No	Promontory	218-0891006
B450	Mar 2018	PCIe 2.0 ×6	Yes	No	2, 2, 6	4	0, 1, 10	Yes	Yes, with PBO	~5.8 W	Varies (Note: Beta BIOS updates may be made available by motherboard manufacturers.)	Yes	Yes	Yes	Varies	No	Promontory	218-0891011
X470	Mar 2018	PCIe 2.0 ×8	Yes	Yes	2, 6, 6	8	0, 1, 10	Yes	Yes, with PBO	~5.8 W	Varies	Yes	Yes	Yes	Varies	No	Promontory	218-0891008
A520	Aug 2020	PCIe 3.0 ×6	No		1, 2, 6	4	0, 1, 10	Yes	No	~5.8 W	Varies	Varies	Yes	Yes	Varies	No	Promontory	218-0891015
B550 (Note: OEM-only B550A is a rebranded B450)	Jun 2020	PCIe 3.0 ×10	Yes	Varies	2, 2, 6	6	0, 1, 10	Yes	Yes, with PBO	~7W	Varies	Varies	Yes	Yes	Varies	UDIMM (Note: No guarantees, it depends on the motherboard and CPU)	Promontory	218-0891014 - b550, 218-0891009 - B550A
X570	Jul 2019	PCIe 4.0 ×16	Yes	Yes	8, 0, 4	12	0, 1, 10	Yes	Yes, with PBO	~15 W (Note: 7 watts on passive cooling (termed X570s).)	No	Yes	Yes	Yes	Yes	UDIMM	Bixby	100-CG3091

== Compatibility ==
In 2020, AMD faced some criticism when it was announced on May 7 that its Zen 3-based Ryzen 5000 microprocessors would only be compatible with newer 500-series chipset AM4 motherboards. This was explained as motherboard BIOS's sizes not being large enough to support the full range of AM4 socket processors. This had upset some of the user base as, described by AnandTech, they "...had assumed that this meant any AM4 platform based motherboard would be able to accept all processor made from 2016 to 2020, including the new Zen 3...". After the announcement some motherboard manufacturers announced they were planning to add in support for Zen 3 processors via BIOS updates.

On 19 May 2020, however, AMD changed its position and stated that Zen 3 would be coming to selected older X470 and B450 motherboards via a BIOS update. This would be achieved by disabling support for some older AM4 processors in the BIOS ROM in order to allocate space to support the newer processors.

On 12 November 2021, according to TechPowerUp, ASUS and Gigabyte were the few vendors that allowed Ryzen 5000 on A320 motherboard, and according to Tom's Hardware, it was done by removing support for AMD's 7th Generation A-series and Athlon X4 series (Bristol Ridge) processors. AMD later officially expanded Ryzen 5000 support to 300-series motherboards in March 2022.

== See also ==
- Socket AM5
- Socket TR4
- Socket sTRX4
