= Socket AM5 =

CPU socket for AMD Ryzen processors with Zen architecture

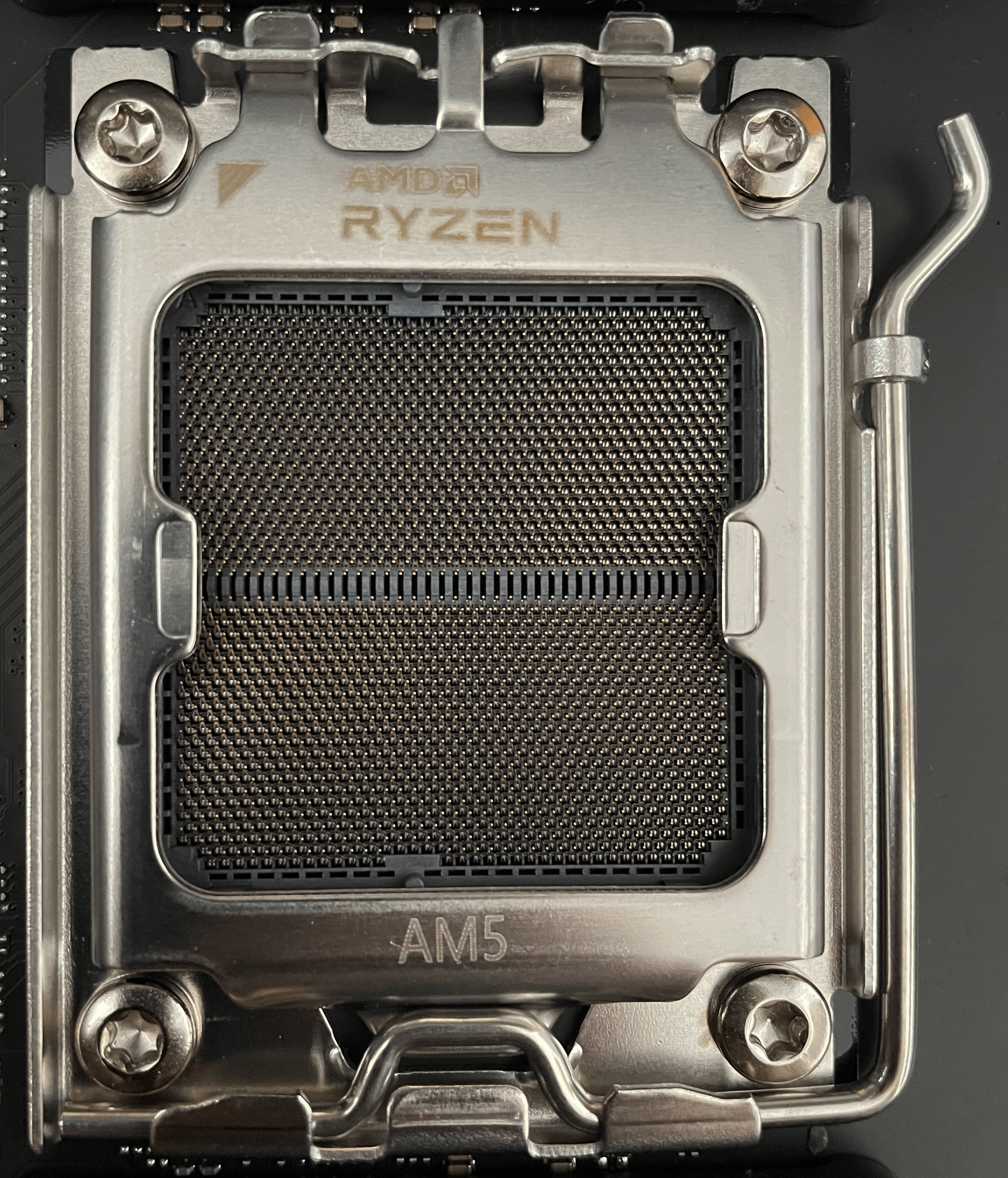
- Release date: September 27, 2022
- Designed by: AMD
- Manufactured by: Lotes, Foxconn
- Type: LGA-ZIF
- Chip form factors: Flip-chip
- Contacts: 1718
- FSB protocol: PCI Express, Infinity Fabric
- Voltage range: 0.8 V (cores); 1.05 V (in-package I/O die)
- Processor dimensions: 40 × 40 mm 1,600 mm^{2}
- Processors: Ryzen: Ryzen 7000 Series (Raphael); Ryzen 8000 Series (Phoenix); Ryzen 9000 Series (Granite Ridge); Epyc: Epyc 4004 Series; Epyc 4005 Series
- Predecessor: AM4
- Memory support: DDR5
- This article is part of the CPU socket series

Socket AM5 (LGA 1718) is a zero insertion force flip-chip land grid array (LGA) CPU socket designed by AMD that is used for AMD Ryzen microprocessors starting with the Zen 4 microarchitecture. AM5 was launched in September 2022 and is the successor to AM4.

The Ryzen 7000 series processors were the first AM5 processors. The 7000 series added support for PCI Express 5.0 and DDR5.

== History ==
In March 2017, with the launch of its new Zen processors, AMD used the AM4 socket that they had previously used with their Bristol Ridge (derived from Excavator) powered Athlon X4 and some A-Series, a pin grid array (PGA) socket that they promised to support until 2020.

At CES 2022, AMD CEO Lisa Su unveiled the AM5 socket and the integrated heat spreader design for the upcoming Ryzen 7000 processors due in late 2022.

On May 23, 2022, AMD provided details about the AM5 socket, its corresponding motherboards, and Ryzen 7000 Series CPUs at Computex in Taipei, Taiwan. At Computex, motherboard vendors ASRock, Gigabyte and others debuted their new X670 motherboards featuring the AM5 socket.

AMD stated that it plans to support the AM5 socket for a number of years as it did with the AM4 socket. During the Ryzen 7000 series reveal on August 29, 2022, AMD confirmed that it would support the AM5 socket until at least 2025. At Computex 2024, AMD announced that this support period would then be extended through 2027. At Computex 2026, AMD announced that the support period would be extended through 2029.

== Features ==
- Supports DDR5 in dual-channel configuration. DDR4 is not supported, unlike Intel's LGA 1700 socket.
- Support for PCIe 5.0 lanes from the CPU on X870E, X870, B850, X670E and B650E chipsets: Configurable PCIe 5.0 x16 (GPU) + x4 (M.2) + x4 (M.2 or USB4) + x4 (Unified Media Interface)
- Achieves 170 W TDP (Note: Thermal design power) and a Package Power Tracking (PPT) (Note: Electrical power dissipation) limit up to 230 W
- Uses SVI3 power interface to reduce OEM deviation

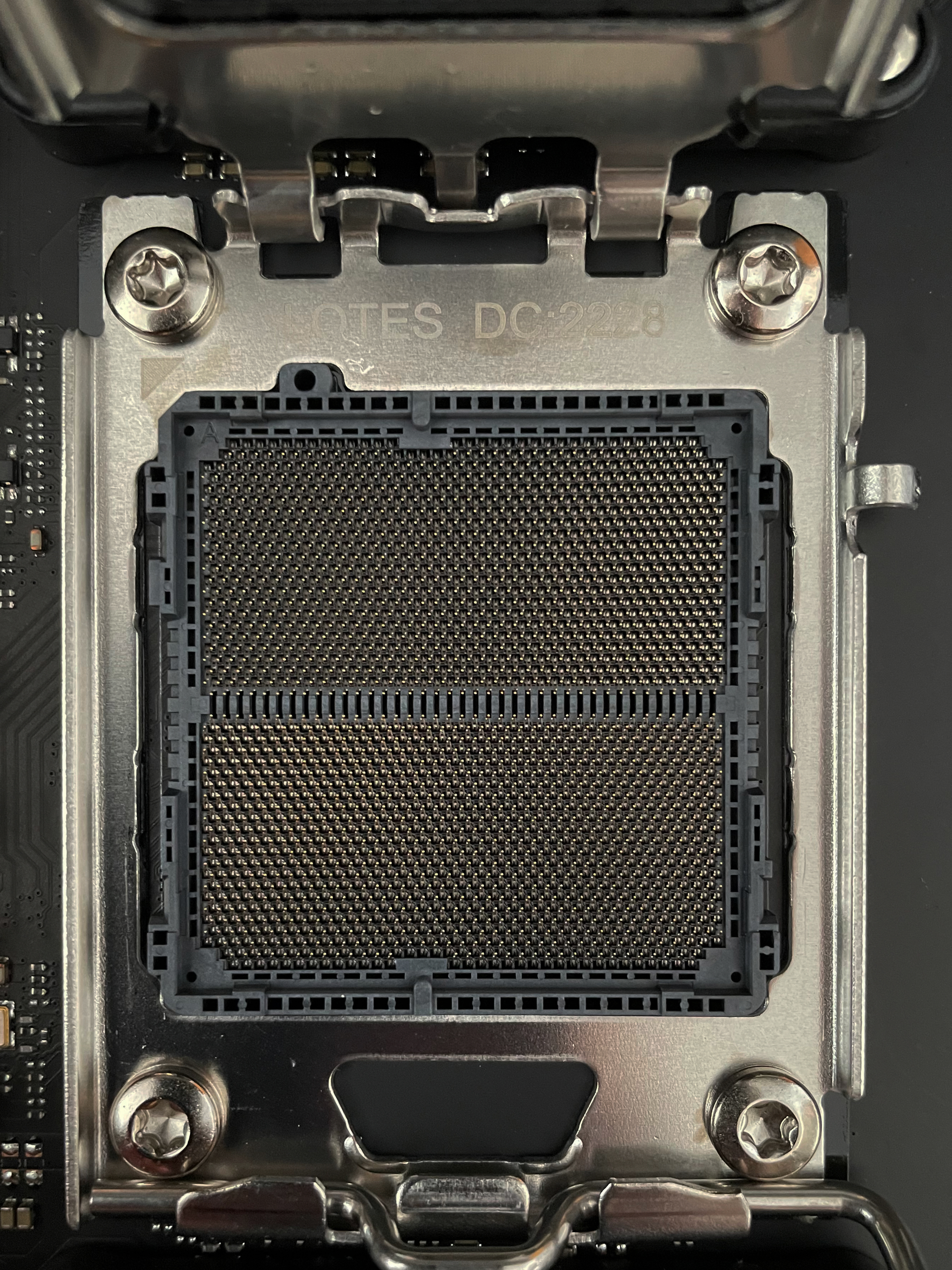
Image of the AM5 socket with the Socket Actuation Mechanism (SAM) in open position, exposing the pins

Pin map of the AM5 socket from AMD

== Heatsink ==
The AM5 socket specifies four holes for fastening the heatsink to the motherboard to be placed at the corners of a rectangle with a lateral length of 54×90 mm, as well as UNC #6-32 screw threads for the backplate, identical to those of the preceding AM4 socket. Furthermore, the Z-height of the CPU package is kept the same as that of AM4, for backward compatibility of heatsinks.

Unlike AM4, the backplate on AM5 is not removable, as it also serves the purpose of securing the CPU retention mechanism for the LGA socket.

Not all existing CPU coolers from AM4 are compatible. In particular, coolers that use their own backplate mounting hardware, instead of the default motherboard-provided backplate, will not work. Some cooler manufacturers are offering upgrade kits to allow incompatible older coolers to be used on AM5.

== Chipsets ==
The AM5 chipsets line-up had been criticised for being confusing due to chipsets with very similar prefixes (and tens-digit-place designation) having very different meanings between 600 and 800 series. (Note: X670 and X870 would be considered having very similar names, based on naming of previous chipset generations, but X870 is mostly identical to B650E (not X670) in terms of architecture and features provided by the chipset itself.)

=== 600 series ===
The AM5 600 series chipsets were released alongside the release of Ryzen 7000 series desktop CPUs.

- A620 / A620A – The most entry level 600 series chipset
- B650 – Compared to A620: Added features making processor overclocking possible, chipset PCIe 4.0 support, and higher speeds USB 3.2 available
- B650E – Compared to B650: Added support for PCIe 5.0 lanes coming from CPU. (Requires CPU also has PCIe 5.0 support)

X670/X670E uses 2 "Promontory 21" silicon by ASMedia. One of which connected to the CPU, and the second one daisy chained to the first one.

- X670 – With the doubled chipset, the number of SATA ports, USB lanes, and chipset PCI lanes doubled (4 of PCIe 4.0 lanes used on connecting chipset) – compared to B650/B650E. However, PCIe 5.0 lanes connectivity from the CPU only has support to the M.2/GPP slot not to the primary x16 slot.
- X670E – Added Primary PCIe x16 slot Gen 5 support compared to X670.

=== 800 series ===
The AM5 800 series chipsets were released roughly around or after the Ryzen 9000 series desktop CPUs' launch.

- B840 – Very similar in features with A620. (Note it's very different from B850 despite the similarly in name.)
- B850 – Compared to B650: The PCIe 5.0 support for the primary M.2 slot becomes mandatory (instead of optional).
- X870 – Mostly identical to B650E in terms of functionality from the chipset, with a mandated addition of a third-party USB4 controller.

X870E also daisy chained 2 "Promontory 21" silicon as X670/X670E. (Note that is not the case for X870 despite the name)

- X870E – Functionality wise, it's mostly identical to X670E, with a mandated addition of a third-party USB4 controller.

=== Feature table ===
			A620 / A620A	B650	B650E	X670	X670E	B840	B850	X870	X870E
Processor features support	CPU support	Zen 4	Yes								
Processor features support	CPU support	Zen 5	Yes (Note: A BIOS update is more likely to be needed if the motherboard was manufactured at an earlier date.)					Yes			
Processor features support	CPU overclocking		No	Yes				No	Yes		
Processor features support	PCIe 5.0 support (Note: Support for Gen5 speeds on lanes directly from CPU to expansion and M.2 slots, and general-purpose lanes. (Also depends on CPU PCIe support. Some CPUs have as low as 10 lanes of PCIe 4.0 available.))	x16 slot	No	No	Yes	No	Yes	No	Optional	Yes	
Processor features support	PCIe 5.0 support	M.2 slot (Note: The "first" M.2 slot.) + 4× GPP (Note: Some motherboards connect GPP lanes to a second M.2 slot.)	No	M.2: Optional	Yes			No	M.2: Yes	Yes	
Processor features support	PCIe 5.0 support	M.2 slot + 4× GPP	No	GPP: No	Yes			No	GPP: No	Yes	
Processor features support	PCIe 4.0 support (Note: Per AMD specifications, these PCIe 4.0 lanes are allocated for the primary GPU slot as a fallback when PCIe 5.0 is unavailable. PCIe bifurcation is supported per spec, but actual availability depends on the motherboard manufacturer's implementation.)		1x16	1x16 or 2x8	No	1x16 or 2x8	No	1x16	1x16 or 2x8	No	
Processor features support	USB ports	USB 3.2 Gen 2x1	4								
Chipset features	ECC memory		UDIMM (Note: No guarantees, it depends on the motherboard and CPU)								
Chipset features	PCIe lanes (Note: PCIe lanes provided by the chipset. The CPU provides other PCIe 5.0 and/or 4.0 lanes.)	Gen 4	None	×8		×12		None	×8		×12
Chipset features	PCIe lanes	Gen 3	Up to ×8	Up to ×4		Up to ×8		Up to ×10	Up to x4		Up to ×8
Chipset features	USB ports	USB 2.0	6			12		6			12
Chipset features	USB ports	USB 3.2 Gen 1x1 (5 Gb/s)	2	None				2	None		
Chipset features	USB ports	USB 3.2 Gen 2x1 (10 Gb/s)	2	with max x2 ports: 4 without x2 ports: 6 (Note: The motherboard maker may configure the total of 6 USB 3.2 lanes provided by the chipset into "4× USB3.2 Gen 2x1 and 1× USB3.2 Gen 2x2" or "6× USB3.2 Gen 2x1 and 0× USB3.2 Gen 2x2" ports.)		with max x2 ports: 8 without x2 ports: 12 (Note: The motherboard maker may configure the total of 12 USB 3.2 lanes provided by the chipset into one of the following: "8× USB3.2 Gen 2x1 and 2× USB3.2 Gen 2x2", "10× USB3.2 Gen 2x1 and 1× USB3.2 Gen 2x2", or "12× USB3.2 Gen 2x1 and 0× USB3.2 Gen 2x2")		2	with max x2 ports: 4 without x2 ports: 6		with max x2 ports: 8 without x2 ports: 12
Chipset features	USB ports	USB 3.2 Gen 2x2 (20 Gb/s)	None	Up to 1		Up to 2		None	Up to 1		Up to 2
Chipset features	Storage features	SATA III ports	Up to 4			Up to 8		Up to 4			Up to 8
Chipset features	Storage features	RAID	0, 1, 10								
Platform features	USB4 Gen 3×2 (40 Gb/s) (Note: Provided by a third-party controller.)		Optional							Yes	
Platform features	Wi-Fi		Optional (Note: AMD did not mandate which Wi-Fi version should be paired with which chipset (unlike USB4 is mandatory with some chipsets). Motherboard makers may omit Wi-Fi on some models.)								
Platform features	PCIe x16 slot configurations		1×16	1×16 or 2×8				1×16	1×16 or 2×8		
Platform features	Multi-GPU	CrossFire	No	Yes	Yes	Yes	Yes	No	?	Yes	Yes
Platform features	Multi-GPU	SLI	No								
Chipset links		To CPU	PCIe 4.0 ×4								
Chipset links		Interchipset	No			PCIe 4.0 ×4		No			PCIe 4.0 ×4
Chipset TDP			~4.5 W	~7 W		~14 W (Note: Two Promontory 21 chipsets are present, each having a TDP of ~7 W, giving a total TDP of ~14 W.)		?	~7 W		~14 W
Architecture			Promontory 22 / 21 x1 (A620); Promontory 19 x1 (A620A)	Promontory 21 ×1		Promontory 21 ×2		Promontory 19 ×1	Promontory 21 ×1		Promontory 21 ×2
Release date			Mar 31, 2023	Oct 10, 2022		Sep 27, 2022		Jan 6, 2025		Sep 2024	
References											
			A620 / A620A	B650	B650E	X670	X670E	B840	B850	X870	X870E

== See also ==
- Socket sTR5, a socket for AMD HEDT and workstation CPUs
- Socket SP5, a socket for AMD server CPUs
