= Athlon X4 =

Series of budget AMD microprocessors for personal computers

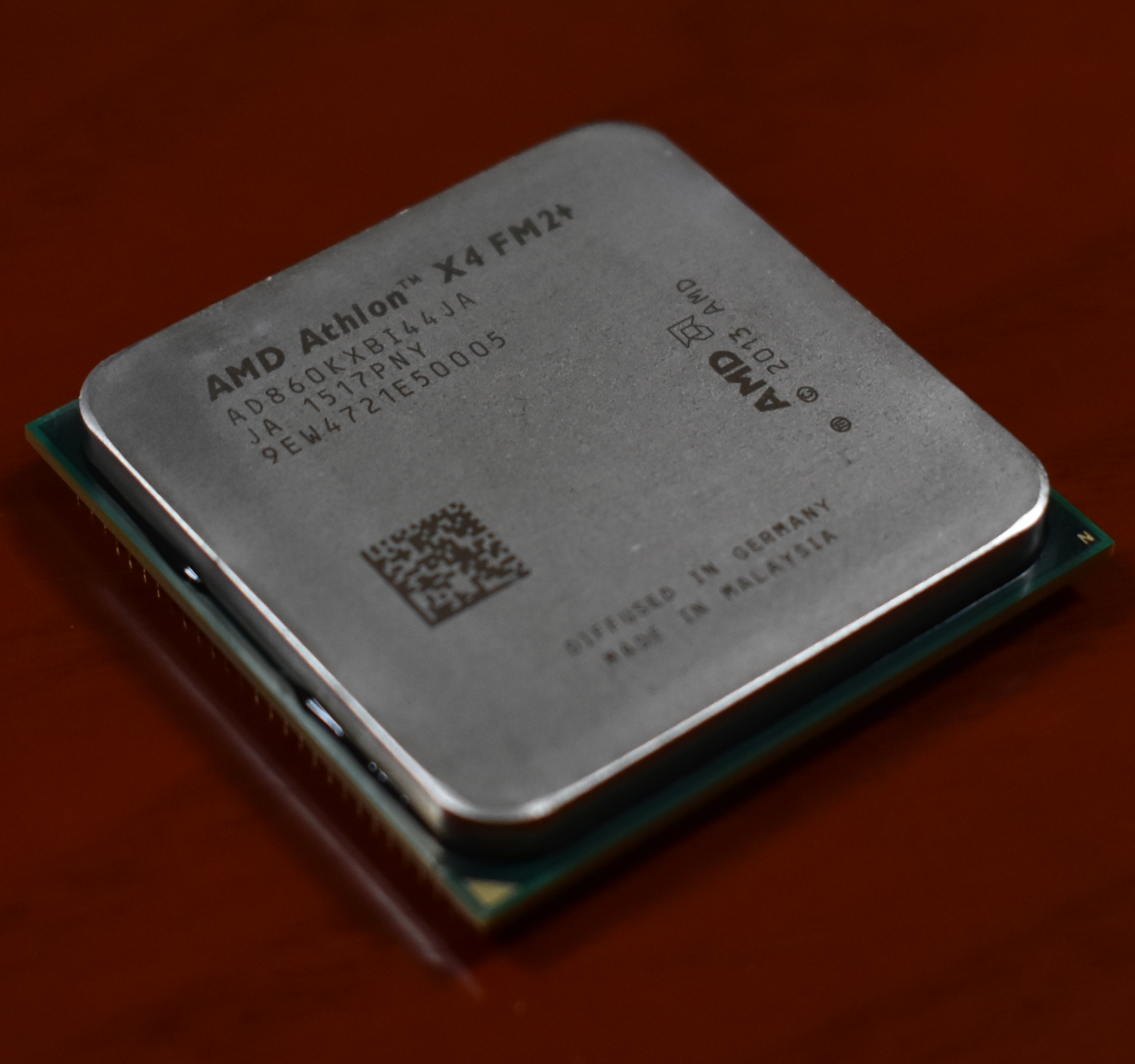
- AMD Athlon X4

General information
- Launched: 2013
- Designed by: AMD
- Common manufacturer: GlobalFoundries

Performance
- Max. CPU clock rate: 3.1 GHz to 4.2 GHz

Physical specifications
- Cores: 4/4 (Cores/Modules)
- Socket: Socket FM2, Socket FM2+, Socket AM4

Architecture and classification
- Technology node: 32 nm to 28 nm
- Microarchitecture: Richland, Kaveri, Carrizo
- Instruction set: AMD64/x86-64, MMX(+), SSE1, 2, 3, S3, 4.1, 4.2, 4a, AES, CLMUL, AVX, XOP, FMA3, FMA4, CVT16/F16C, BMI1, ABM, TBM

Products, models, variants
- Model: AMD Athlon X4 Quad-Core Processors

AMD Athlon X4 is a series of budget AMD microprocessors for personal computers. These processors are distinct from A-Series APUs of the same era due to the lack of iGPUs.

== "Richland" (2013, 32 nm) ==
- Socket FM2
- CPU: Two or four Piledriver-cores
- GPU TeraScale 3 (VLIW4)
- MMX, SSE(1, 2, 3, S3, 4a, 4.1, 4.2), AMD64, AMD-V, AES, AVX, XOP, FMA(4, 3), CVT16, F16C, BMI(ABM, TBM), Turbo Core 3.0, NX bit
- PowerNow!

Model number	Step.	CPU														GPU			DDR3 Memory support	Maximum Junction Temperature	TDP (W)	Released	Part number
Model number	Step.	Cores	Frequency (Voltage) (GHz)									Cache		V_{core}		Model	Config^{2}	Freq.	DDR3 Memory support	Maximum Junction Temperature	TDP (W)	Released	Part number
Model number	Step.	Cores	Lower Power					Base	Turbo 1	Turbo 2	Turbo 3	L1(Data + Instructions)	L2 (MB)	Operating frequency range	Maximum	Model	Config^{2}	Freq.	DDR3 Memory support	Maximum Junction Temperature	TDP (W)	Released	Part number
Sempron X2 240	A1	2						2.9			3.3	2x 16KB + 64KB	1			—N/a			?		65	?	SD240XOKA23HJ
Sempron X2 250	A1	2						3.2			3.6	2x 16KB + 64KB	1			—N/a			?		65	?	SD250XOKA23HL
Athlon X2 350	A1	2						3.5			3.9	2x 16KB + 64KB	1	0.825 - 1.475		—N/a			1866		65		AD350XOKA23HL
Athlon X2 370K	A1	2	2.0	2.5	3.0	3.4	3.7	4.0		4.1	4.2	2x 16KB + 64KB	1	0.825 - 1.475		—N/a			1866		65	Jun 2013	AD370KOKA23HL; AD370KOKHLBOX
Athlon X4 750	A1	4						3.4			3.9	4x 16KB + 2x 64KB	2× 2MB			—N/a			1866		65		AD750XOKA44HL
Athlon X4 760K	A1	4		1.8	2.3	2.9	3.5	3.8	3.9	4.0	4.1	4x 16KB + 2x 64KB	2× 2MB			—N/a			1866		100	Jun 2013	AD760KWOA44HL; AD760KWOHLBOX

== "Kaveri" (2014, 28 nm) ==
- Socket FM2+, support for PCIe 3.0
- Two or four CPU cores based on the Steamroller microarchitecture
- AMD Heterogeneous System Architecture (HSA) 2.0
- Dual-channel (2× 64 Bit) DDR3 memory controller
- Integrated custom ARM Cortex-A5 co-processor with TrustZone Security Extensions

Model number	Stepping	CPU					GPU			DDR3 Memory support	TDP (W)	Released	Part number
Model number	Stepping	Cores	Freq. (GHz)		Cache		Model	Config	Freq.	DDR3 Memory support	TDP (W)	Released	Part number
Model number	Stepping	Cores	Base	Turbo	L1 (Data + Instruction)	L2 (MB)	Model	Config	Freq.	DDR3 Memory support	TDP (W)	Released	Part number
Athlon X2 450	A1	2	3.5	3.9	2x 16KB + 96KB	1	—N/a			1866	65	Aug 2014	AD450XYBI23JA
Athlon X4 830	A1	4	3.0	3.4	4x 16KB + 2x 96KB	2× 2MB	—N/a			2133	65	?	AD830XYBI44JA
Athlon X4 840	A1	4	3.1	3.8	4x 16KB + 2x 96KB	2× 2MB	—N/a			2133	65	Aug 2014	AD840XYBI44JA
Athlon X4 860K	A1	4	3.7	4.0	4x 16KB + 2x 96KB	2× 2MB	—N/a			2133	95	Aug 2014	AD860KXBI44JA; AD860KXBJABOX; AD860KWOHLBOX; AD860KXBJASBX
Athlon X4 870K	A1	4	3.9	4.1	4x 16KB + 2x 96KB	2× 2MB	—N/a			2133	95	?	AD870KXBI44JC; AD870KXBJCSBX
Athlon X4 880K	A1	4	4.0	4.2	4x 16KB + 2x 96KB	2× 2MB	—N/a			2133	95	Mar 1, 2016	AD880KXBI44JC; AD880KXBJCSBX

== "Carrizo" (2016, 28 nm) ==
- Socket FM2+, support for PCIe 3.0
- Four CPU cores based on the Excavator microarchitecture
- Dual-channel (2× 64 Bit) DDR3 memory controller

Model number	Stepping	CPU					GPU			DDR3 Memory support	TDP (W)	Released	Part number
Model number	Stepping	Cores	Freq. (GHz)		Cache		Model	Config	Freq.	DDR3 Memory support	TDP (W)	Released	Part number
Model number	Stepping	Cores	Base	Turbo	L1 (Data + Instruction)	L2	Model	Config	Freq.	DDR3 Memory support	TDP (W)	Released	Part number
Athlon X4 835	?	4	3.1	N/A	4x 32KB + 2x 96KB	2× 1MB	—N/a			2133	65	?	AD835XACI43KA
Athlon X4 845	?	4	3.5	3.8	4x 32KB + 2x 96KB	2× 1MB	—N/a			2133	65	Feb 2, 2016	AD845XYBJCSBX; AD845XACKASBX

== "Bristol Ridge" (2017, 28 nm) ==
- Socket AM4, support for PCIe 3.0
- Four CPU cores based on the Excavator microarchitecture
- Dual-channel DDR4 memory controller
- MMX, SSE(1, 2, 3, S3, 4a, 4.1, 4.2), AMD64, AMD-V, AES, AVX(1, 2), XOP, FMA(4, 3), CVT16, F16C, BMI(ABM, TBM), Turbo Core 3.0, NX bit

Model number	Step.	CPU					GPU			DDR4 Memory support	TDP (W)	Released	Part number
Model number	Step.	Cores	Freq. (GHz)		Cache		Model	Config	Freq.	DDR4 Memory support	TDP (W)	Released	Part number
Model number	Step.	Cores	Base	Turbo	L1 (Data + Instruction)	L2	Model	Config	Freq.	DDR4 Memory support	TDP (W)	Released	Part number
Athlon X4 940	A1	4	3.2	3.6	4x 32KB + 2x 96KB	2x 1MB	—N/a			2400	65	July 27, 2017	AD940XAGM44AB; AD940XAGABBOX
Athlon X4 950	A1	4	3.5	3.8	4x 32KB + 2x 96KB	2x 1MB	—N/a			2400	65	July 27, 2017	AD950XAGM44AB; AD950XAGABBOX
Athlon X4 970	A1	4	3.8	4.0	4x 32KB + 2x 96KB	2x 1MB	—N/a			2400	65	July 27, 2017	AD970XAUM44AB; AD970XAUABBOX

== See also ==
- Bulldozer (microarchitecture)
- Piledriver (microarchitecture)
- AMD APU
- List of AMD FX processors
