= Zen 2 =

2019 AMD 7-nanometer processor microarchitecture

AMD Zen 2

General information
- Launched: 7 July 2019; 7 years ago
- Designed by: AMD
- Common manufacturers: TSMC (core complex die); GlobalFoundries (I/O die)
- CPUID code: Family 17h

Physical specifications
- Transistors: 5.89 billion (1× CCD) or 9.69 billion (2× CCD) (3.8 billion per 7 nm 8-core "CCD" & 2.09 billion for the 12 nm "I/O die")
- Cores: 4–16 (desktop); 24–64 (HEDT); 12–64 (workstation); Up to 64 (server); 2–8 (mobile)
- Sockets: Socket AM4; Socket sTRX4; Socket sWRX8; Socket SP3

Cache
- L1 cache: 64 KB per core: 32 KB instructions; 32 KB data
- L2 cache: 512 KB per core
- L3 cache: 16 MB per CCX (APU: 8 MB)

Architecture and classification
- Technology node: TSMC N7; TSMC N6
- Microarchitecture: Zen
- Instruction set: AMD64 (x86-64)
- Extensions: Crypto AES, SHA; SIMD MMX-plus, SSE, SSE2, SSE3, SSSE3, SSE4.1, SSE4.2, SSE4A, FMA3, AVX, AVX2

Products, models, variants
- Product code names: Matisse (desktop); Rome (server); Castle Peak (HEDT/workstation); Renoir (Desktop APU, mobile and embedded); Mendocino (mobile and embedded refresh)
- Brand names: Ryzen; Ryzen Threadripper; Epyc; Athlon

History
- Predecessor: Zen+
- Successor: Zen 3

Support status
- Supported

Zen 2 is a computer processor microarchitecture by AMD. It is the successor of AMD's Zen and Zen+ microarchitectures, and is fabricated on the 7 nm MOSFET node from TSMC. The microarchitecture powers the third generation of Ryzen processors, known as Ryzen 3000 for the mainstream desktop chips (codename "Matisse"), Ryzen 4000U/H (codename "Renoir") and Ryzen 5000U (codename "Lucienne") for mobile applications, as Threadripper 3000 for high-end desktop systems, and as Ryzen 4000G for accelerated processing units (APUs). The Ryzen 3000 series CPUs were released on 7 July 2019, while the Zen 2-based Epyc server CPUs (codename "Rome") were released on 7 August 2019. An additional chip, the Ryzen 9 3950X, was released in November 2019.

At CES 2019, AMD showed a Ryzen third-generation engineering sample that contained one chiplet with eight cores and 16 threads. AMD CEO Lisa Su also said to expect more than eight cores in the final lineup. At Computex 2019, AMD revealed that the Zen 2 "Matisse" processors would feature up to 12 cores, and a few weeks later a 16 core processor was also revealed at E3 2019, being the aforementioned Ryzen 9 3950X.

Zen 2 includes hardware mitigations to the Spectre security vulnerability. Zen 2-based EPYC server CPUs use a design in which multiple CPU dies (up to eight in total) manufactured on a 7 nm process ("chiplets") are combined with a 14nm I/O die (as opposed to the 12nm IOD on Matisse variants) on each multi-chip module (MCM) package. Using this, up to 64 physical cores and 128 total compute threads (with simultaneous multithreading) are supported per socket. This architecture is nearly identical to the layout of the "pro-consumer" flagship processor Threadripper 3990X. Zen 2 delivers about 15% more instructions per clock than Zen and Zen+, the 14- and 12-nm microarchitectures utilized on first and second generation Ryzen, respectively.

The Steam Deck, PlayStation 5, Xbox Series X and Series S all use chips based on the Zen 2 microarchitecture, with proprietary tweaks and different configurations in each system's implementation than AMD sells in its own commercially available APUs.

== Design ==
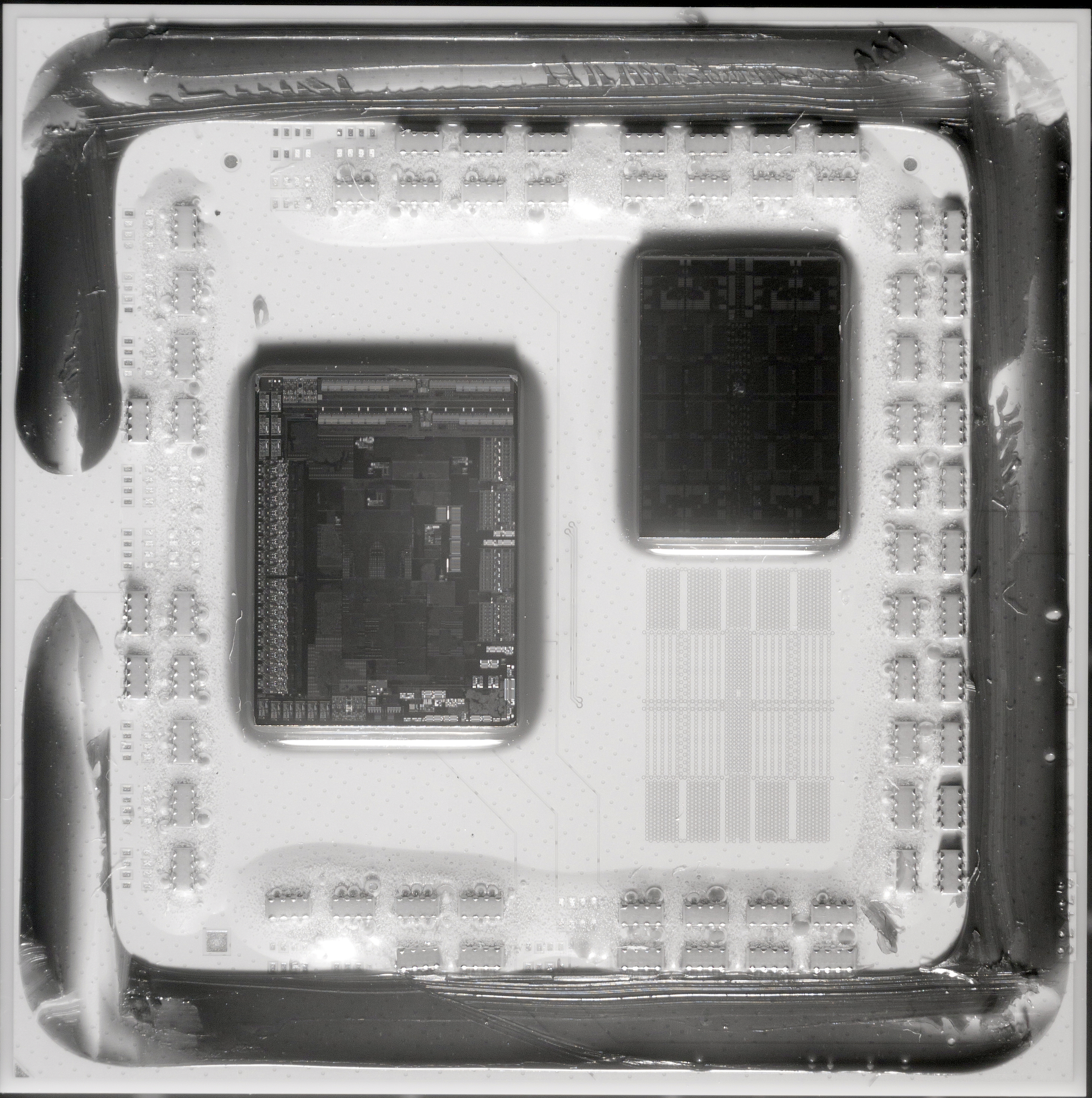
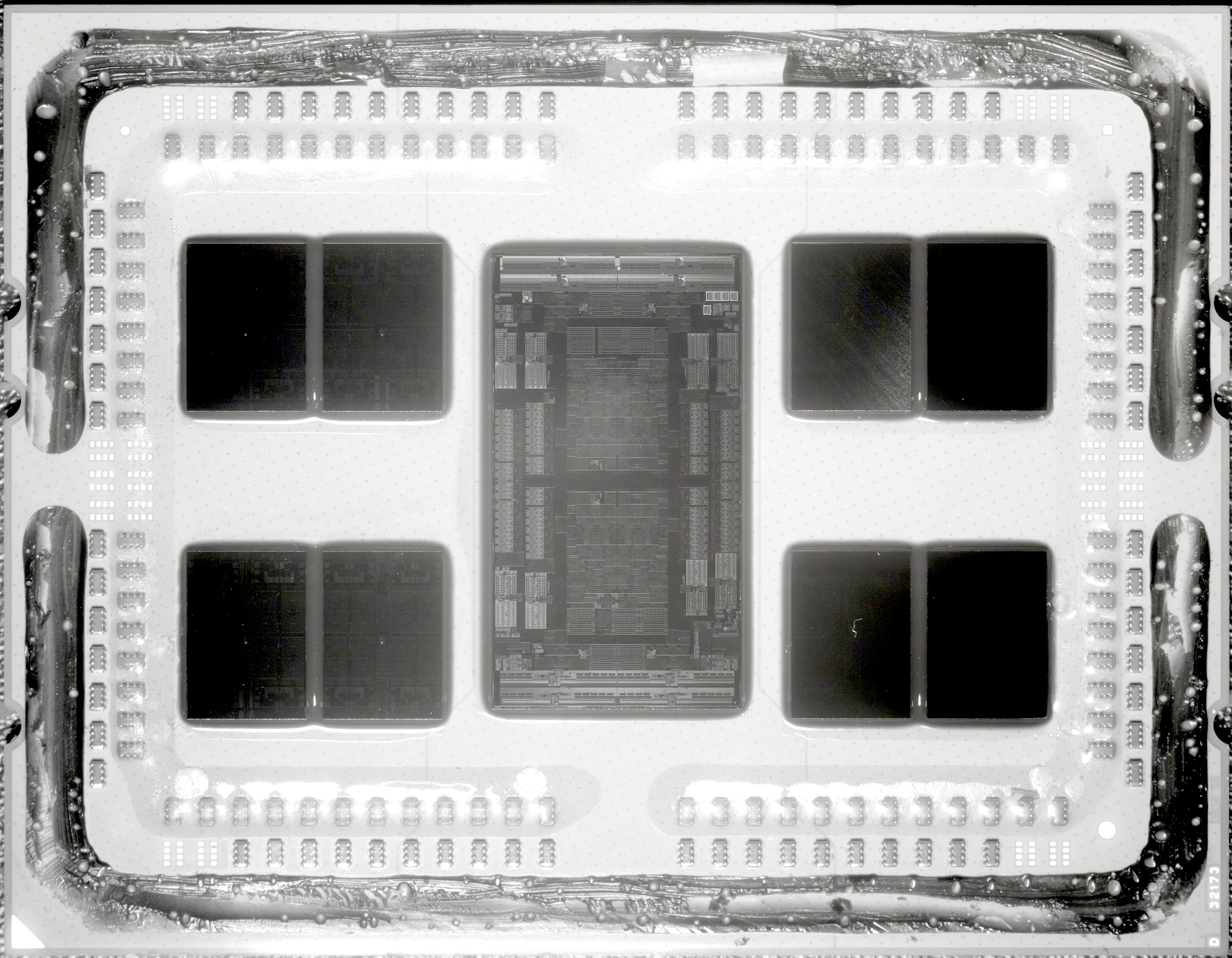
Two delidded Zen 2 processors designed with the multi-chip module approach. The Ryzen 5 3600 CPU on the left/top (used for mainstream Ryzen CPUs) uses a smaller, less capable I/O die and one CCD (the space for an additional CCD is used on the Ryzen 9), while the Epyc 7702 on the right/bottom (used for high-end desktop, HEDT, Ryzen Threadripper and server Epyc CPUs) uses a larger, more capable I/O die and up to eight CCDs.

Zen 2 is a significant departure from the physical design paradigm of AMD's previous Zen architectures, Zen and Zen+. Zen 2 moves to a multi-chip module design where the I/O components of the CPU are laid out on its own die which is separate from the dies containing processor cores, which are also called chiplets in this context. This separation has benefits in scalability and manufacturability. As physical interfaces don't scale very well with shrinks in process technology, their separation into a different die allows these components to be manufactured using a larger, more mature process node than the CPU dies. The CPU dies (referred to by AMD as core complex dies or CCDs), now more compact due to the move of I/O components onto another die, can be manufactured using a smaller process with fewer manufacturing defects than a larger die would exhibit (since the chances of a die having a defect increases with device (die) size) while also allowing for more dies per wafer. In addition, the central I/O die can service multiple chiplets, making it easier to construct processors with a large number of cores.

Simplified illustration of the Zen 2 microarchitecture

On the left (top on mobile): Die shot of a Zen 2 Core Complex Die. On the middle: Die shot of a Zen 2 EPYC/Threadripper I/O die, On the right (bottom): I/O die of a Zen 2 mainstream Ryzen I/O die.

With Zen 2, each CPU chiplet houses 8 CPU cores, arranged in 2 core complexes (CCXs), each of 4 CPU cores. These chiplets are manufactured using TSMC's 7 nanometer MOSFET node and are about 74 to 80 mm^{2} in size. The chiplet has about 3.8 billion transistors, while the 12 nm I/O die (IOD) is ~125 mm^{2} and has 2.09 billion transistors. The amount of L3 cache has been doubled to 32 MB, with each CCX in the chiplet now having access to 16 MB of L3 compared to the 8 MB of Zen and Zen+. AVX2 performance is greatly improved by an increase in execution unit width from 128-bit to 256-bit. There are multiple variants of the I/O die: one manufactured on GlobalFoundries 14 nanometer process, and another manufactured using the same company's 12 nanometer process. The 14 nanometer dies have more features and are used for the EPYC Rome processors, whereas the 12 nm versions are used for consumer processors. Both processes have similar feature sizes, so their transistor density is also similar.

AMD's Zen 2 architecture can deliver higher performance at a lower power consumption than Intel's Cascade Lake architecture, with an example being the AMD Ryzen Threadripper 3970X running with a TDP of 140 W in ECO mode delivering higher performance than the Intel Core i9-10980XE running with a TDP of 165 W.

=== New features ===
- Some new instruction set extensions: WBNOINVD, CLWB, RDPID, RDPRU, MCOMMIT. Each instruction uses its own CPUID bit.
- Hardware mitigations against the Spectre V4 speculative store bypass vulnerability.
- Zero-latency memory mirroring optimization (undocumented).
- Doubled width of the execution units and load store units (from 128-bit to 256-bit) in the floating point coprocessor and significant further throughput enhancements in the multiplication execution unit. This allows the FPU to perform single-cycle AVX2 calculations.
- Introduced CPPC power management.

== Feature tables ==
=== APUs ===
APU features table

== Products ==
On 26 May 2019, AMD announced six Zen 2-based desktop Ryzen processors (codenamed "Matisse"). These included 6-core and 8-core variants in the Ryzen 5 and Ryzen 7 product lines, as well as a new Ryzen 9 line that includes the company's first 12-core and 16-core mainstream desktop processors.

The Matisse I/O die is also used as the X570 chipset.

AMD's second generation of Epyc processors, codenamed "Rome", feature up to 64 cores, and were launched on 7 August 2019.

=== Desktop CPUs ===
==== Matisse (3000 series) ====
Common features of Ryzen 3000 desktop CPUs:

- Socket: AM4.
- All the CPUs support DDR4-3200 in dual-channel mode.
- L1 cache: 64 KB (32 KB data + 32 KB instruction) per core.
- L2 cache: 512 KB per core.
- All the CPUs support 24 PCIe 4.0 lanes. 4 of which are reserved as link to the chipset.
- No integrated graphics.
- Fabrication process: TSMC 7FF.

Branding and Model		Cores (threads)	Clock rate (GHz)		L3 cache (total)	TDP	Chiplets (Note: A Core Complex Die contains 1-2 Core Complexes (CCXs).)	Core config (Note: Core Complexes (CCXs) × cores per CCX)	Thermal Solution	Release date	MSRP
Branding and Model		Cores (threads)	Base	Boost	L3 cache (total)	TDP	Chiplets	Core config	Thermal Solution	Release date	MSRP
Ryzen 9	3950X	16 (32)	3.5	4.7	64 MB	105 W (Note: Ryzen 9 3900X and Ryzen 9 3950X may consume over 145 W under load.)	2 × CCD; 1 × I/OD	4 × 4	—N/a	Nov 25, 2019	US $749
Ryzen 9	3900XT	12 (24)	3.8	4.7	64 MB	105 W	2 × CCD; 1 × I/OD	4 × 3	—N/a	Jul 7, 2020	US $499
Ryzen 9	3900X	12 (24)	3.8	4.6	64 MB	105 W	2 × CCD; 1 × I/OD	4 × 3	Wraith Prism	Jul 7, 2019	US $499
Ryzen 9	3900 (Note: Model also available as PRO 3600, PRO 3700, PRO 3900, released on September 30, 2019 for OEMs.)	12 (24)	3.1	4.3	64 MB	65 W	2 × CCD; 1 × I/OD	4 × 3	—N/a	Oct 8, 2019	OEM
Ryzen 7	3800XT	8 (16)	3.9	4.7	32 MB	105 W	1 × CCD; 1 × I/OD	2 × 4	—N/a	Jul 7, 2020	US $399
Ryzen 7	3800X	8 (16)	3.9	4.5	32 MB	105 W	1 × CCD; 1 × I/OD	2 × 4	Wraith Prism	Jul 7, 2019	US $399
Ryzen 7	3700X	8 (16)	3.6	4.4	32 MB	65 W (Note: Ryzen 7 3700X may consume 90 W under load.)	1 × CCD; 1 × I/OD	2 × 4	Wraith Prism	Jul 7, 2019	US $329
Ryzen 5	3600XT	6 (12)	3.8	4.5	32 MB	95 W	1 × CCD; 1 × I/OD	2 × 3	—N/a	Jul 7, 2020	US $249
Ryzen 5	3600X	6 (12)	3.8	4.4	32 MB	95 W	1 × CCD; 1 × I/OD	2 × 3	Wraith Spire (non-LED)	Jul 7, 2019	US $249
Ryzen 5	3600	6 (12)	3.6	4.2	32 MB	65 W	1 × CCD; 1 × I/OD	2 × 3	Wraith Stealth	Jul 7, 2019	US $199
Ryzen 5	3500X	6 (6)	3.6	4.1	32 MB	65 W	1 × CCD; 1 × I/OD	2 × 3	Wraith Stealth	Oct 8, 2019	CNY 1099 (Mainland China Only)
Ryzen 5	3500	6 (6)	3.6	4.1	16 MB	65 W	1 × CCD; 1 × I/OD	2 × 3	—N/a	Nov 15, 2019	OEM (Worldwide) JPY 16000 (Japan Only)
Ryzen 3	3300X	4 (8)	3.8	4.3	16 MB	65 W	1 × CCD; 1 × I/OD	1 × 4	Wraith Stealth	Apr 21, 2020	US $119
Ryzen 3	3100	4 (8)	3.6	3.9	16 MB	65 W	1 × CCD; 1 × I/OD	2 × 2	Wraith Stealth	Apr 21, 2020	US $99

==== Castle Peak (3000 series) ====
Common features of Ryzen 3000 HEDT/workstation CPUs:

- Socket: sTRX4 (Threadripper), sWRX8 (Threadripper PRO).
- Threadripper CPUs support DDR4-3200 in quad-channel mode while Threadripper PRO CPUs support DDR4-3200 in octa-channel mode.
- L1 cache: 64 KB (32 KB data + 32 KB instruction) per core.
- L2 cache: 512 KB per core.
- Threadripper CPUs support 64 PCIe 4.0 lanes while Threadripper PRO CPUs support 128 PCIe 4.0 lanes. 8 of the lanes are reserved as link to the chipset.
- No integrated graphics.
- Fabrication process: TSMC 7FF.

Branding and Model		Cores (threads)	Clock rate (GHz)		L3 cache (total)	TDP	Chiplets	Core config (Note: Core Complexes (CCXs) × cores per CCX)	Release date	MSRP
Branding and Model		Cores (threads)	Base	Boost	L3 cache (total)	TDP	Chiplets	Core config	Release date	MSRP
Ryzen Threadripper PRO	3995WX	64 (128)	2.7	4.2	256 MB	280 W (Note: Ryzen Threadripper 3990X may consume over 490 W under load.)	8 × CCD; 1 × I/OD	16 × 4	Jul 14, 2020	
Ryzen Threadripper PRO	3975WX	32 (64)	3.5	4.2	128 MB	280 W	4 × CCD; 1 × I/OD	8 × 4	Jul 14, 2020	
Ryzen Threadripper PRO	3955WX	16 (32)	3.9	4.3	64 MB	280 W	2 × CCD; 1 × I/OD	4 × 4	Jul 14, 2020	
Ryzen Threadripper PRO	3945WX	12 (24)	4.0	4.3	64 MB	280 W	2 × CCD; 1 × I/OD	4 × 3	Jul 14, 2020	
Ryzen Threadripper	3990X	64 (128)	2.9	4.3	256 MB	280 W	8 × CCD; 1 × I/OD	16 × 4	Feb 7, 2020	US $3990
Ryzen Threadripper	3970X	32 (64)	3.7	4.5	128 MB	280 W	4 × CCD; 1 × I/OD	8 × 4	Nov 25, 2019	US $1999
Ryzen Threadripper	3960X	24 (48)	3.8	4.5	128 MB	280 W	4 × CCD; 1 × I/OD	8 × 3	Nov 25, 2019	US $1399

==== Renoir (4000 series) ====
Based on the Ryzen 4000G series APUs but with the integrated graphics disabled. Common features of Ryzen 4000 desktop CPUs:

- Socket: AM4.
  - The AMD 4700S uses the BGA 2197 socket and the 4800S uses BGA 2963.
- All the CPUs support DDR4-3200 in dual-channel mode.
- L1 cache: 64 KB (32 KB data + 32 KB instruction) per core.
- L2 cache: 512 KB per core.
- All the CPUs support 24 PCIe 3.0 lanes. 4 of the lanes are reserved as link to the chipset.
- No integrated graphics.
- Fabrication process: TSMC 7FF.
- Bundled with AMD Wraith Stealth

The AMD 4700S and 4800S desktop processors are part of a "desktop kit" that comes bundled with a motherboard and GDDR6 RAM. The CPU is soldered, and provides 4 PCIe 2.0 lanes. These are reportedly cut-down variants of the APUs found on the PlayStation 5 and Xbox Series X and S repurposed from defective chip stock.

Branding and model		Cores (threads)	Clock rate (GHz)		L3 cache (total)	TDP	Core config (Note: Core Complexes (CCX) × cores per CCX)	Release date	MSRP
Branding and model		Cores (threads)	Base	Boost	L3 cache (total)	TDP	Core config	Release date	MSRP
AMD	4800S	8 (16)	3.6	4.0	8 MB		2 × 4	2022	bundled with desktop kit
AMD	4700S	8 (16)	3.6	4.0	8 MB	75 W	2 × 4	2021	bundled with desktop kit
Ryzen 7	4700LE	8 (16)	3.6	4.2	8 MB	65 W	2 × 4	Mar 25, 2026	OEM
Ryzen 5	4500	6 (12)	3.6	4.1	8 MB	65 W	2 × 3	Apr 4, 2022	US $129
Ryzen 3	4100	4 (8)	3.8	4.0	4 MB	65 W	1 × 4	Apr 4, 2022	US $99

=== Desktop APUs ===
Initially only provided to OEM; later, AMD released retail Zen 2 desktop APUs in April 2022. Common features of Ryzen 4000 desktop APUs:

- Socket: AM4.
- All the CPUs support DDR4-3200 in dual-channel mode.
- L1 cache: 64 KB (32 KB data + 32 KB instruction) per core.
- L2 cache: 512 KB per core.
- All the CPUs support 24 PCIe 3.0 lanes. 4 of the lanes are reserved as link to the chipset.
- Includes integrated GCN 5th generation GPU.
- Fabrication process: TSMC 7FF.

Branding and model		CPU					GPU				TDP	Release date	Release price
Branding and model		Cores (threads)	Clock rate (GHz)		L3 cache (total)	Core Config (Note: Core complexes (CCXs) × cores per CCX)	Model	Clock (GHz)	Config (Note: Unified shaders : Texture mapping units : Render output units and Compute units (CU))	Processing power (Note: Single-precision performance is calculated from the base (or boost) core clock speed based on a FMA operation.) (GFLOPS)	TDP	Release date	Release price
Branding and model		Cores (threads)	Base	Boost	L3 cache (total)	Core Config	Model	Clock (GHz)	Config	Processing power (GFLOPS)	TDP	Release date	Release price
Ryzen 7	4700G (Note: Model also available as PRO version as 4350GE, 4350G, 4650GE, 4650G, 4750GE, 4750G, released on July 21, 2020 for OEM only. Refresh models 4355GE, 4355G, 4655GE, 4655G released November 11, 2022.)	8 (16)	3.6	4.4	8 MB	2 × 4	Radeon; Graphics (Note: All of the iGPUs are branded as AMD Radeon Graphics.)	2.1	512:32:16; 8 CU	2150.4	65 W	Jul 21, 2020	OEM
Ryzen 7	4700GE	8 (16)	3.1	4.3	8 MB	2 × 4	Radeon; Graphics	2.0	512:32:16; 8 CU	2048	35 W	Jul 21, 2020	OEM
Ryzen 5	4600G	6 (12)	3.7	4.2	8 MB	2 × 3	Radeon; Graphics	1.9	448:28:14; 7 CU	1702.4	65 W	Jul 21, 2020 (OEM); Apr 4, 2022 (retail)	US $154
Ryzen 5	4600GE	6 (12)	3.3	4.2	8 MB	2 × 3	Radeon; Graphics	1.9	448:28:14; 7 CU	1702.4	35 W	Jul 21, 2020	OEM
Ryzen 3	4300G	4 (8)	3.8	4.0	4 MB	1 × 4	Radeon; Graphics	1.7	384:24:12; 6 CU	1305.6	65 W	Jul 21, 2020	OEM
Ryzen 3	4300GE	4 (8)	3.5	4.0	4 MB	1 × 4	Radeon; Graphics	1.7	384:24:12; 6 CU	1305.6	35 W	Jul 21, 2020	OEM

=== Mobile APUs ===
==== Renoir (4000 series) ====
Common features of Ryzen 4000 notebook APUs:

- Socket: FP6.
- All the CPUs support DDR4-3200 or LPDDR4-4266 in dual-channel mode.
- L1 cache: 64 KB (32 KB data + 32 KB instruction) per core.
- L2 cache: 512 KB per core.
- All the CPUs support 16 PCIe 3.0 lanes.
- Includes integrated GCN 5th generation GPU.
- Fabrication process: TSMC 7FF.

Branding and Model		CPU					GPU				TDP	Release date
Branding and Model		Cores (threads)	Clock rate (GHz)		L3 cache (total)	Core config (Note: Core Complexes (CCX) × cores per CCX)	Model	Clock (GHz)	Config (Note: Unified shaders : texture mapping units : render output units and compute units (CU))	Processing power (GFLOPS) (Note: Single precision performance is calculated from the base (or boost) core clock speed based on a FMA operation.)	TDP	Release date
Branding and Model		Cores (threads)	Base	Boost	L3 cache (total)	Core config	Model	Clock (GHz)	Config	Processing power (GFLOPS)	TDP	Release date
Ryzen 9	4900H	8 (16)	3.3	4.4	8 MB	2 × 4	Radeon; Graphics (Note: All of the iGPUs are branded as AMD Radeon Graphics.)	1.75	512:32:8; 8 CU	1792	35–54 W	Mar 16, 2020
Ryzen 9	4900HS	8 (16)	3.0	4.3	8 MB	2 × 4	Radeon; Graphics	1.75	512:32:8; 8 CU	1792	35 W	Mar 16, 2020
Ryzen 7	4800H	8 (16)	2.9	4.2	8 MB	2 × 4	Radeon; Graphics	1.6	448:28:8; 7 CU	1433.6	35–54 W	Mar 16, 2020
Ryzen 7	4800HS	8 (16)	2.9	4.2	8 MB	2 × 4	Radeon; Graphics	1.6	448:28:8; 7 CU	1433.6	35 W	Mar 16, 2020
Ryzen 7	4980U (Note: Only found on the Microsoft Surface Laptop 4.)	8 (16)	2.0	4.4	8 MB	2 × 4	Radeon; Graphics	1.95	512:32:8; 8 CU	1996.8	10–25 W	Apr 13, 2021
Ryzen 7	4800U	8 (16)	1.8	4.2	8 MB	2 × 4	Radeon; Graphics	1.75	512:32:8; 8 CU	1792	10–25 W	Mar 16, 2020
Ryzen 7	4700U (Note: Model also available as PRO version as 4450U, 4650U, 4750U, released May 7, 2020.)	8 (8)	2.0	4.1	8 MB	2 × 4	Radeon; Graphics	1.6	448:28:8; 7 CU	1433.6	10–25 W	Mar 16, 2020
Ryzen 5	4600H	6 (12)	3.0	4.0	8 MB	2 × 3	Radeon; Graphics	1.5	384:24:8; 6 CU	1152	35–54 W	Mar 16, 2020
Ryzen 5	4600HS	6 (12)	3.0	4.0	8 MB	2 × 3	Radeon; Graphics	1.5	384:24:8; 6 CU	1152	35 W	Mar 16, 2020
Ryzen 5	4680U	6 (12)	2.1	4.0	8 MB	2 × 3	Radeon; Graphics	1.5	448:28:8; 7 CU	1344	10–25 W	Apr 13, 2021
Ryzen 5	4600U	6 (12)	2.1	4.0	8 MB	2 × 3	Radeon; Graphics	1.5	384:24:8; 6 CU	1152	10–25 W	Mar 16, 2020
Ryzen 5	4500U	6 (6)	2.3	4.0	8 MB	2 × 3	Radeon; Graphics	1.5	384:24:8; 6 CU	1152	10–25 W	Mar 16, 2020
Ryzen 3	4300U	4 (4)	2.7	3.7	4 MB	1 × 4	Radeon; Graphics	1.4	320:20:8; 5 CU	896	10–25 W	Mar 16, 2020

==== Lucienne (5000 series) ====
Common features of Ryzen 5000 notebook APUs:

- Socket: FP6.
- All the CPUs support DDR4-3200 or LPDDR4-4266 in dual-channel mode.
- L1 cache: 64 KB (32 KB data + 32 KB instruction) per core.
- L2 cache: 512 KB per core.
- All the CPUs support 16 PCIe 3.0 lanes.
- Includes integrated GCN 5th generation GPU.
- Fabrication process: TSMC 7FF.

Branding and Model		CPU					GPU				TDP	Release date
Branding and Model		Cores (threads)	Clock rate (GHz)		L3 cache (total)	Core config (Note: Core Complexes (CCX) × cores per CCX)	Model	Clock (GHz)	Config (Note: Unified shaders : texture mapping units : render output units and compute units (CU))	Processing power (GFLOPS) (Note: Single precision performance is calculated from the base (or boost) core clock speed based on a FMA operation.)	TDP	Release date
Branding and Model		Cores (threads)	Base	Boost	L3 cache (total)	Core config	Model	Clock (GHz)	Config	Processing power (GFLOPS)	TDP	Release date
Ryzen 7	5700U	8 (16)	1.8	4.3	8 MB	2 × 4	Radeon; Graphics (Note: All of the iGPUs are branded as AMD Radeon Graphics.)	1.9	512:32:8; 8 CU	1945.6	10–25 W	Jan 12, 2021
Ryzen 5	5500U	6 (12)	2.1	4.0	8 MB	2 × 3	Radeon; Graphics	1.8	448:28:8; 7 CU	1612.8	10–25 W	Jan 12, 2021
Ryzen 3	5300U	4 (8)	2.6	3.8	4 MB	1 × 4	Radeon; Graphics	1.5	384:24:8; 6 CU	1152	10–25 W	Jan 12, 2021

=== Ultra-mobile APUs ===
In 2022, AMD announced the Mendocino ultra-mobile APUs.

==== Mendocino (7020 series) ====
Common features of Ryzen 7020 notebook APUs:

- Socket: FT6
- All the CPUs support LPDDR5-5500 in dual-channel mode.
- L1 cache: 64 KB (32 KB data + 32 KB instruction) per core.
- L2 cache: 512 KB per core.
- All the CPUs support 4 PCIe 3.0 lanes.
- Native USB 40Gbps (USB4) Ports: 0
- Native USB 10Gbps (USB 3.2 Gen 2 operation mode) Ports: 1
- Includes integrated RDNA 2 GPU.
- Fabrication process: TSMC N6 FinFET.

Branding and Model		CPU					GPU			TDP	Release date
Branding and Model		Cores (threads)	Clock rate (GHz)		L3 cache (total)	Core config (Note: Core Complexes (CCX) × cores per CCX)	Model	Clock (GHz)	Processing power (Note: Single precision performance is calculated from the base (or boost) core clock speed based on a FMA operation.) (GFLOPS)	TDP	Release date
Branding and Model		Cores (threads)	Base	Boost	L3 cache (total)	Core config	Model	Clock (GHz)	Processing power (GFLOPS)	TDP	Release date
Ryzen 5	7520U (Note: Model also available as Chromebook optimized version as 7520C and 7320C released on May 23, 2023)	4 (8)	2.8	4.3	4 MB	1 × 4	610M; 2 CU	1.9	486	15 W	September 20, 2022
Ryzen 3	7320U	4 (8)	2.4	4.1	4 MB	1 × 4	610M; 2 CU	1.9	486	15 W	September 20, 2022

==== Mendocino (10 series) ====
Common features of Ryzen 10 notebook APUs:

- Socket: FT6
- All the CPUs support LPDDR5-5500 in dual-channel mode.
- L1 cache: 64 KB (32 KB data + 32 KB instruction) per core.
- L2 cache: 512 KB per core.
- All the CPUs support 4 PCIe 3.0 lanes.
- Native USB 40Gbps (USB4) Ports: 0
- Native USB 10Gbps (USB 3.2 Gen 2 operation mode) Ports: 1
- Includes integrated RDNA 2 GPU.
- Fabrication process: TSMC N6 FinFET.

Branding and Model		CPU					GPU			TDP	Release date
Branding and Model		Cores (threads)	Clock rate (GHz)		L3 cache (total)	Core config (Note: Core Complexes (CCX) × cores per CCX)	Model	Clock (GHz)	Processing power (GFLOPS)	TDP	Release date
Branding and Model		Cores (threads)	Base	Boost	L3 cache (total)	Core config	Model	Clock (GHz)	Processing power (GFLOPS)	TDP	Release date
Ryzen 5	40	4 (8)	2.8	4.3	4 MB	1 × 4	610M; 2 CU	1.9	486	15 W	October 1, 2025
Ryzen 3	30	4 (8)	2.4	4.1	4 MB	1 × 4	610M; 2 CU	1.9	486	15 W	October 1, 2025

=== Embedded APUs ===
Model	Release date	Fab	CPU						GPU				Socket	PCIe support	Memory support	TDP
Model	Release date	Fab	Cores (threads)	Clock rate (GHz)		Cache			Archi- tecture	Config (Note: Unified Shaders : Texture Mapping Units : Render Output Units and Compute Units (CU))	Clock (GHz)	Processing power (Note: Single-precision performance is calculated from the base (or boost) core clock speed based on a FMA operation.) (GFLOPS)	Socket	PCIe support	Memory support	TDP
Model	Release date	Fab	Cores (threads)	Base	Boost	L1	L2	L3	Archi- tecture	Config	Clock (GHz)	Processing power (GFLOPS)	Socket	PCIe support	Memory support	TDP
V2516	Nov 10, 2020	TSMC; 7FF	6 (12)	2.1	3.95	32 KB inst. 32 KB data per core	512 KB per core	8 MB	GCN 5	384:24:8; 6 CU	1.5	1152	FP6	20 (8+4+4+4); PCIe 3.0	DDR4-3200 dual-channel LPDDR4X-4266 quad-channel	10–25 W
V2546	Nov 10, 2020	TSMC; 7FF	6 (12)	3.0	3.95	32 KB inst. 32 KB data per core	512 KB per core	8 MB	GCN 5	384:24:8; 6 CU	1.5	1152	FP6	20 (8+4+4+4); PCIe 3.0	DDR4-3200 dual-channel LPDDR4X-4266 quad-channel	35–54 W
V2A46	Jan 4, 2023	TSMC; 7FF	6 (12)	3.0	3.2	32 KB inst. 32 KB data per core	512 KB per core	8 MB	GCN 5	448:28:8; 7 CU	1.6	1433.6	FP6	20 (8+4+4+4); PCIe 3.0	DDR4-3200 dual-channel LPDDR4X-4266 quad-channel	35–54 W
V2718	Nov 10, 2020	TSMC; 7FF	8 (16)	1.7	4.15	32 KB inst. 32 KB data per core	512 KB per core	8 MB	GCN 5	448:28:8; 7 CU	1.6	1433.6	FP6	20 (8+4+4+4); PCIe 3.0	DDR4-3200 dual-channel LPDDR4X-4266 quad-channel	10–25 W
V2748	Nov 10, 2020	TSMC; 7FF	8 (16)	2.9	4.25	32 KB inst. 32 KB data per core	512 KB per core	8 MB	GCN 5	448:28:8; 7 CU	1.6	1433.6	FP6	20 (8+4+4+4); PCIe 3.0	DDR4-3200 dual-channel LPDDR4X-4266 quad-channel	35–54 W

=== Server CPUs ===
Common features:

- SP3 socket
- Zen 2 microarchitecture
- TSMC 7 nm process for the compute dies, GloFo 14 nm process for the I/O die
- MCM with one I/O Die (IOD) and multiple Core Complex Dies (CCD) for compute, two core complexes (CCX) per CCD chiplet
- Eight-channel DDR4-3200
- 128 PCIe 4.0 lanes per socket, 64 of which are used for Infinity Fabric inter-processor links in 2P platforms
- 7002P series models are limited to uniprocessor operation (1P, single-socket)

Model	Cores (threads)	Chiplets	Core config (Note: Core Complexes (CCX) × cores per CCX)	Clock rate		Cache			Socket	Scaling	TDP	Release date	Release price
Model	Cores (threads)	Chiplets	Core config	Base (GHz)	Boost (GHz)	L2 per core	L3 per CCX	Total	Socket	Scaling	TDP	Release date	Release price
7232P	8 (16)	2 + IOD	4 × 2	3.1	3.2	512 KB	8 MB	36 MB	SP3	1P	120 W	Aug 7, 2019	$450
7252	8 (16)	2 + IOD	4 × 2	3.1	3.2	512 KB	16 MB	68 MB	SP3	2P	120 W	Aug 7, 2019	$475
7262	8 (16)	4 + IOD	8 × 1	3.2	3.4	512 KB	16 MB	132 MB	SP3	2P	155 W	Aug 7, 2019	$575
7F32	8 (16)	4 + IOD	8 × 1	3.7	3.9	512 KB	16 MB	132 MB	SP3	2P	180 W	Apr 14, 2020	$2100
7272	12 (24)	2 + IOD	4 × 3	2.9	3.2	512 KB	16 MB	70 MB	SP3	2P	120 W	Aug 7, 2019	$625
7282	16 (32)	2 + IOD	4 × 4	2.8	3.2	512 KB	16 MB	72 MB	SP3	2P	120 W	Aug 7, 2019	$650
7302(P)	16 (32)	4 + IOD	8 × 2	3.0	3.3	512 KB	16 MB	136 MB	SP3	2P (1P)	155 W	Aug 7, 2019	$978 ($825)
7F52	16 (32)	8 + IOD	16 × 1	3.5	3.9	512 KB	16 MB	264 MB	SP3	2P	240 W	Apr 14, 2020	$3100
7352	24 (48)	4 + IOD	8 × 3	2.3	3.2	512 KB	16 MB	140 MB	SP3	2P	155 W	Aug 7, 2019	$1350
7402(P)	24 (48)	4 + IOD	8 × 3	2.8	3.35	512 KB	16 MB	140 MB	SP3	2P (1P)	180 W	Aug 7, 2019	$1783 ($1250)
7F72	24 (48)	6 + IOD	12 × 2	3.2	3.7	512 KB	16 MB	204 MB	SP3	2P	240 W	Apr 14, 2020	$2450
7452	32 (64)	4 + IOD	8 × 4	2.35	3.35	512 KB	16 MB	144 MB	SP3	2P	155 W	Aug 7, 2019	$2025
7502(P)	32 (64)	4 + IOD	8 × 4	2.5	3.35	512 KB	16 MB	144 MB	SP3	2P (1P)	180 W	Aug 7, 2019	$2600 ($2300)
7542	32 (64)	4 + IOD	8 × 4	2.9	3.4	512 KB	16 MB	144 MB	SP3	2P	225 W	Aug 7, 2019	$3400
7532	32 (64)	8 + IOD	16 × 2	2.4	3.3	512 KB	16 MB	272 MB	SP3	2P	200 W	Aug 7, 2019	$3350
7552	48 (96)	6 + IOD	12 × 4	2.2	3.3	512 KB	16 MB	216 MB	SP3	2P	200 W	Aug 7, 2019	$4025
7642	48 (96)	8 + IOD	16 × 3	2.3	3.3	512 KB	16 MB	280 MB	SP3	2P	225 W	Aug 7, 2019	$4775
7662	64 (128)	8 + IOD	16 × 4	2.0	3.3	512 KB	16 MB	288 MB	SP3	2P	225 W	Aug 7, 2019	$6150
7702(P)	64 (128)	8 + IOD	16 × 4	2.0	3.35	512 KB	16 MB	288 MB	SP3	2P (1P)	200 W	Aug 7, 2019	$6450 ($4425)
7742	64 (128)	8 + IOD	16 × 4	2.25	3.4	512 KB	16 MB	288 MB	SP3	2P	225 W	Aug 7, 2019	$6950
7H12	64 (128)	8 + IOD	16 × 4	2.6	3.3	512 KB	16 MB	288 MB	SP3	2P	280 W	Sep 18, 2019	---

=== Video game consoles and other embedded ===
- Xbox Series X and Series S
- PlayStation 5
- Steam Deck
- AMD 4700S

== Gallery ==
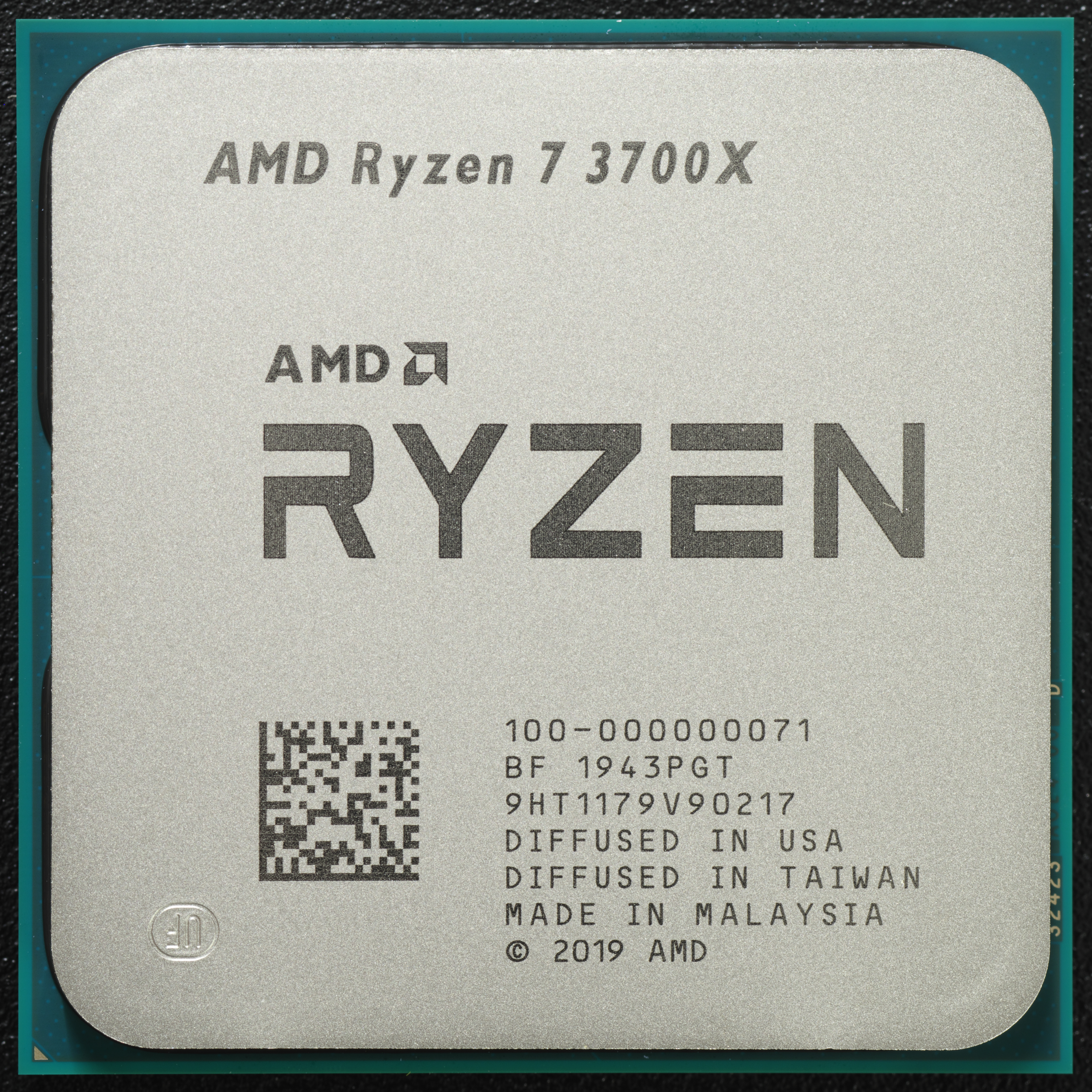
AMD Ryzen 7 3700X

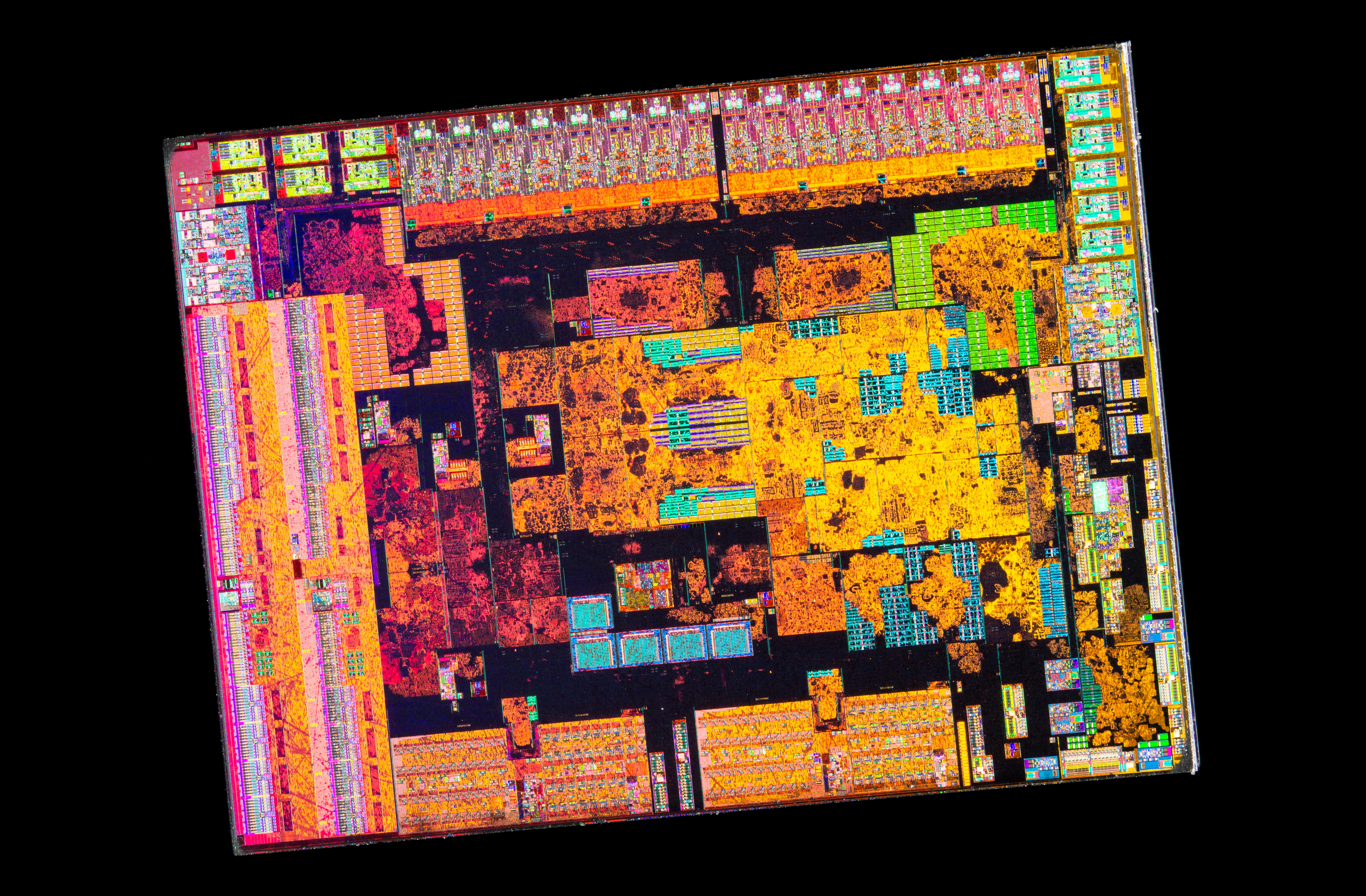
Zen 2 I/O Die

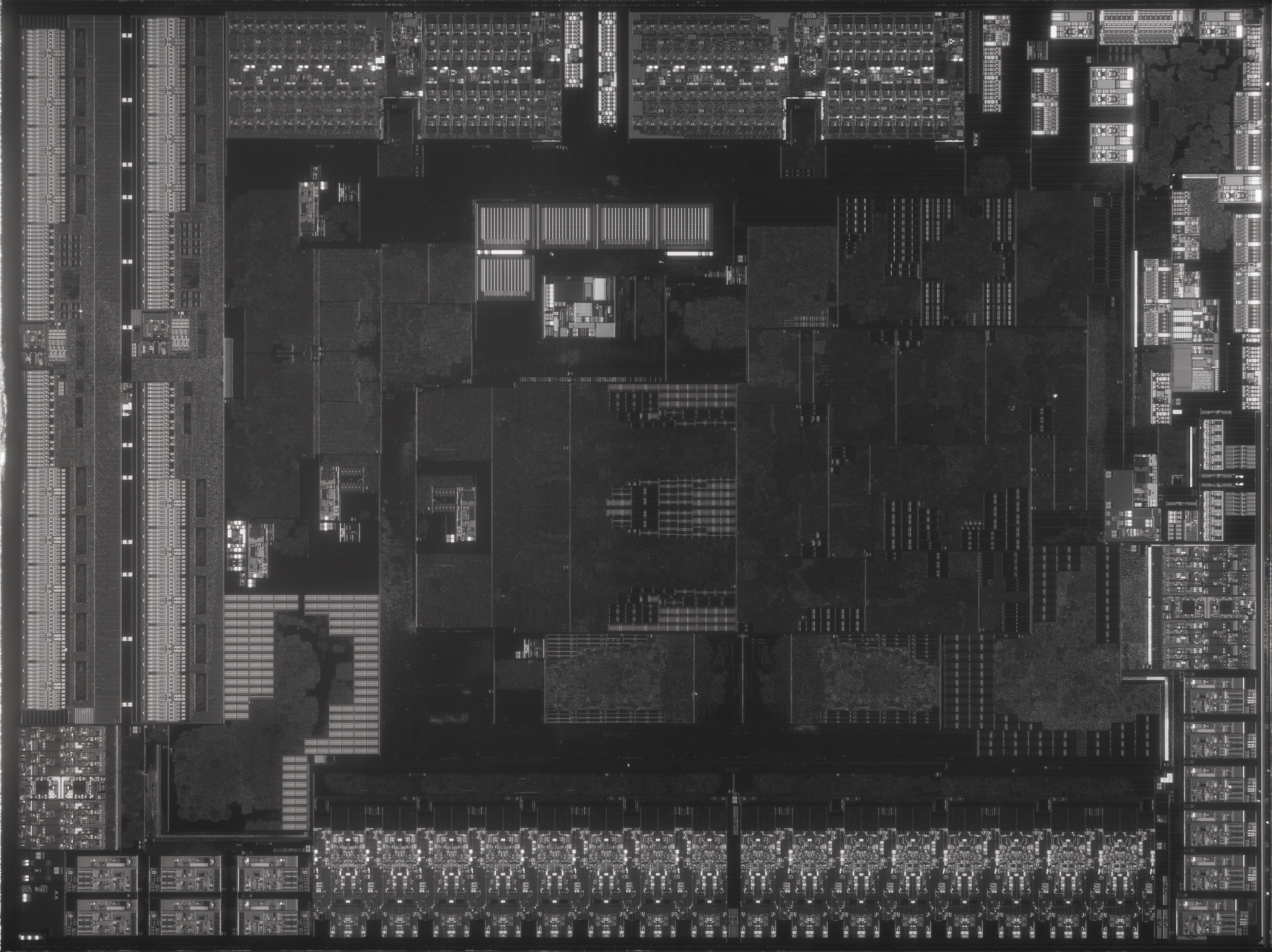
Infrared die shot of the I/O Die

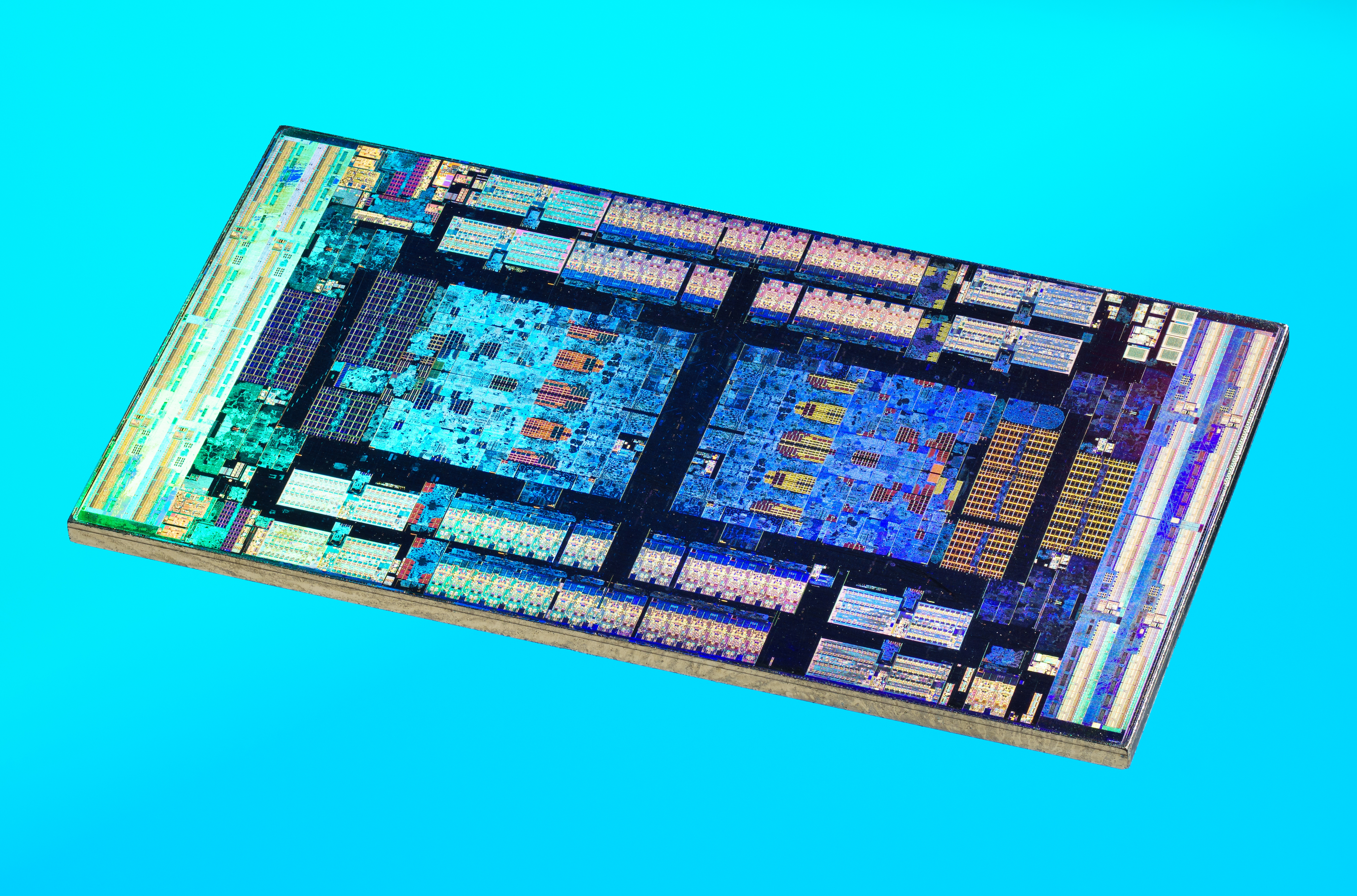
EPYC I/O Die

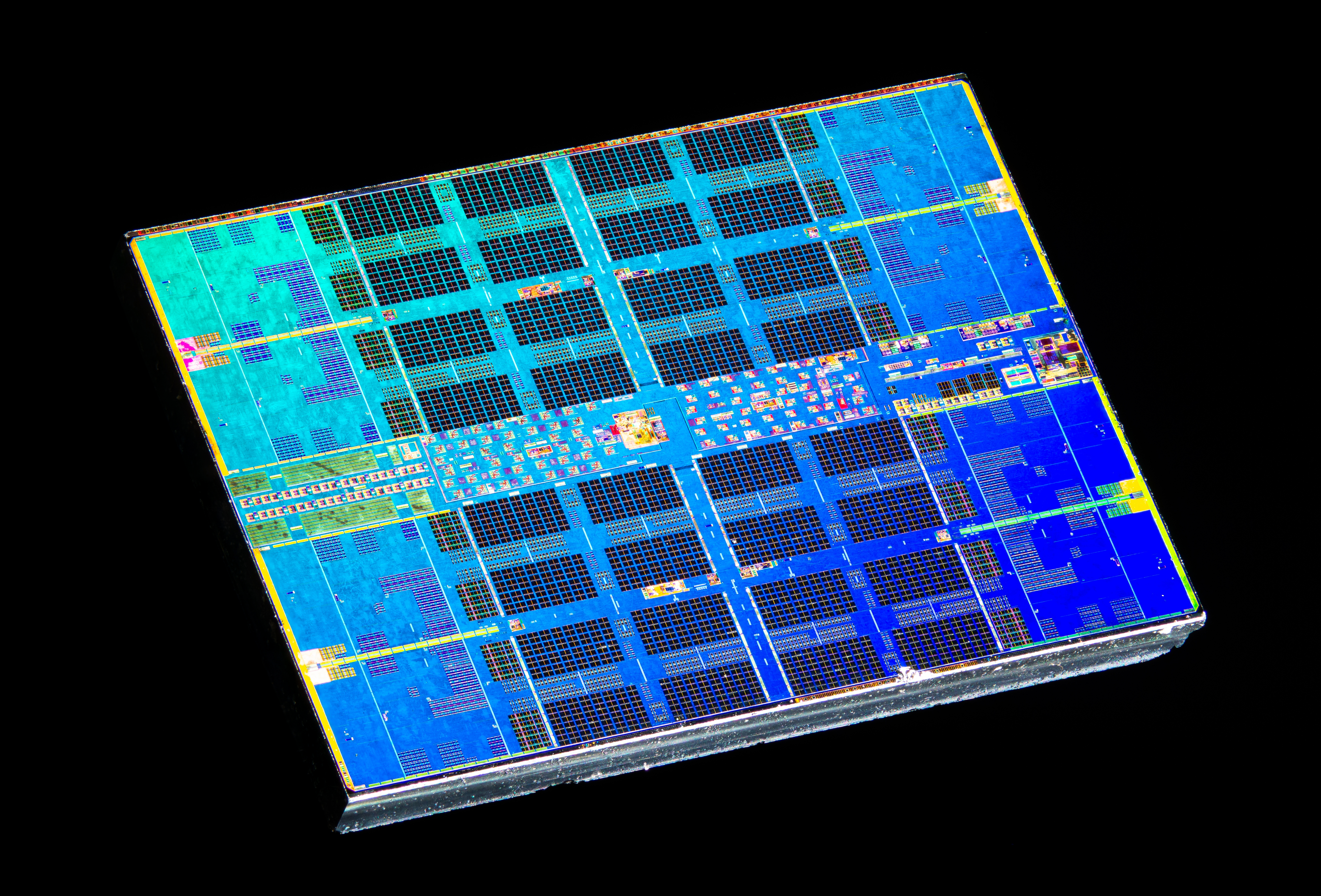
Zen 2 Core Complex Die (CCD)

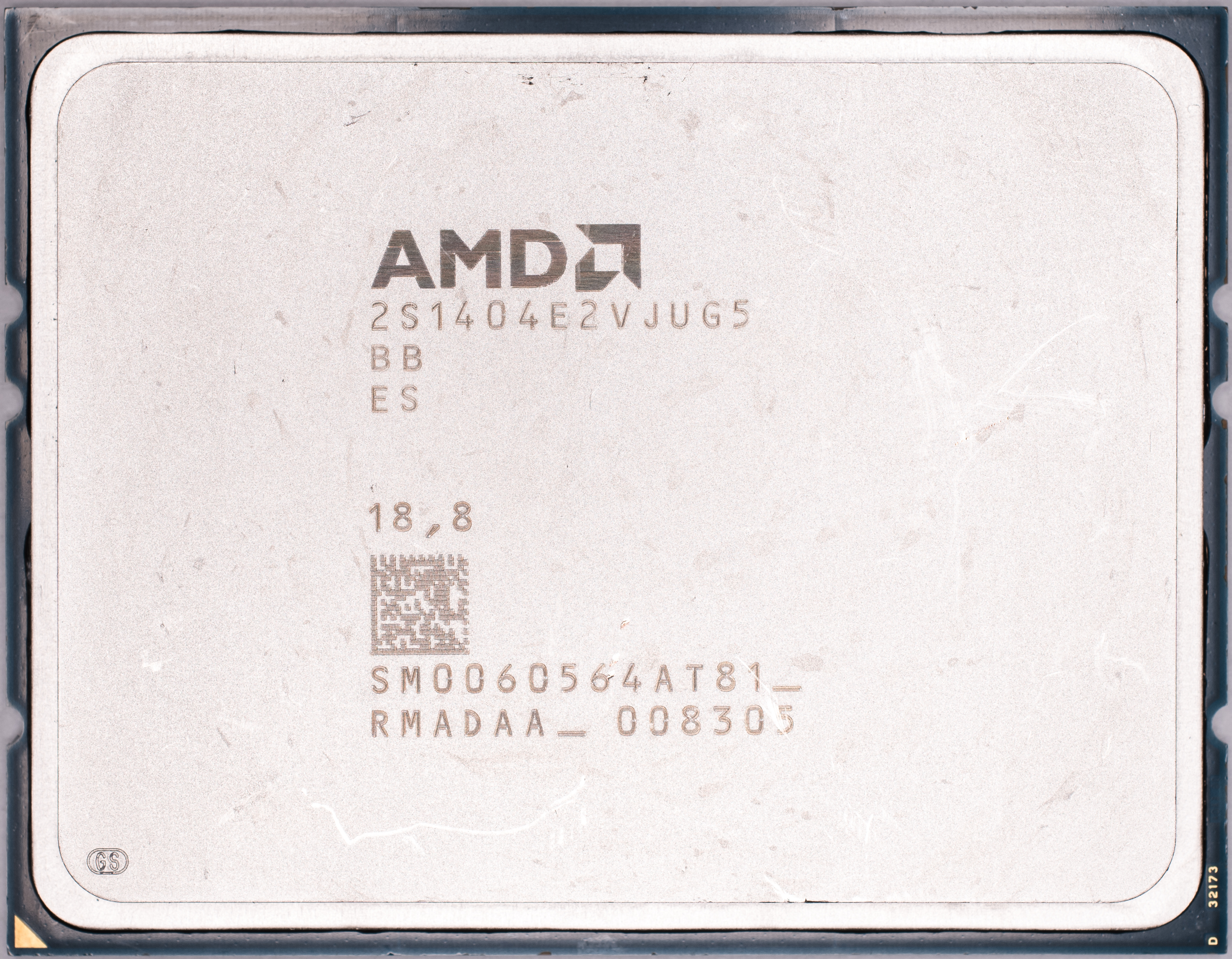
AMD EPYC 7702 server processor

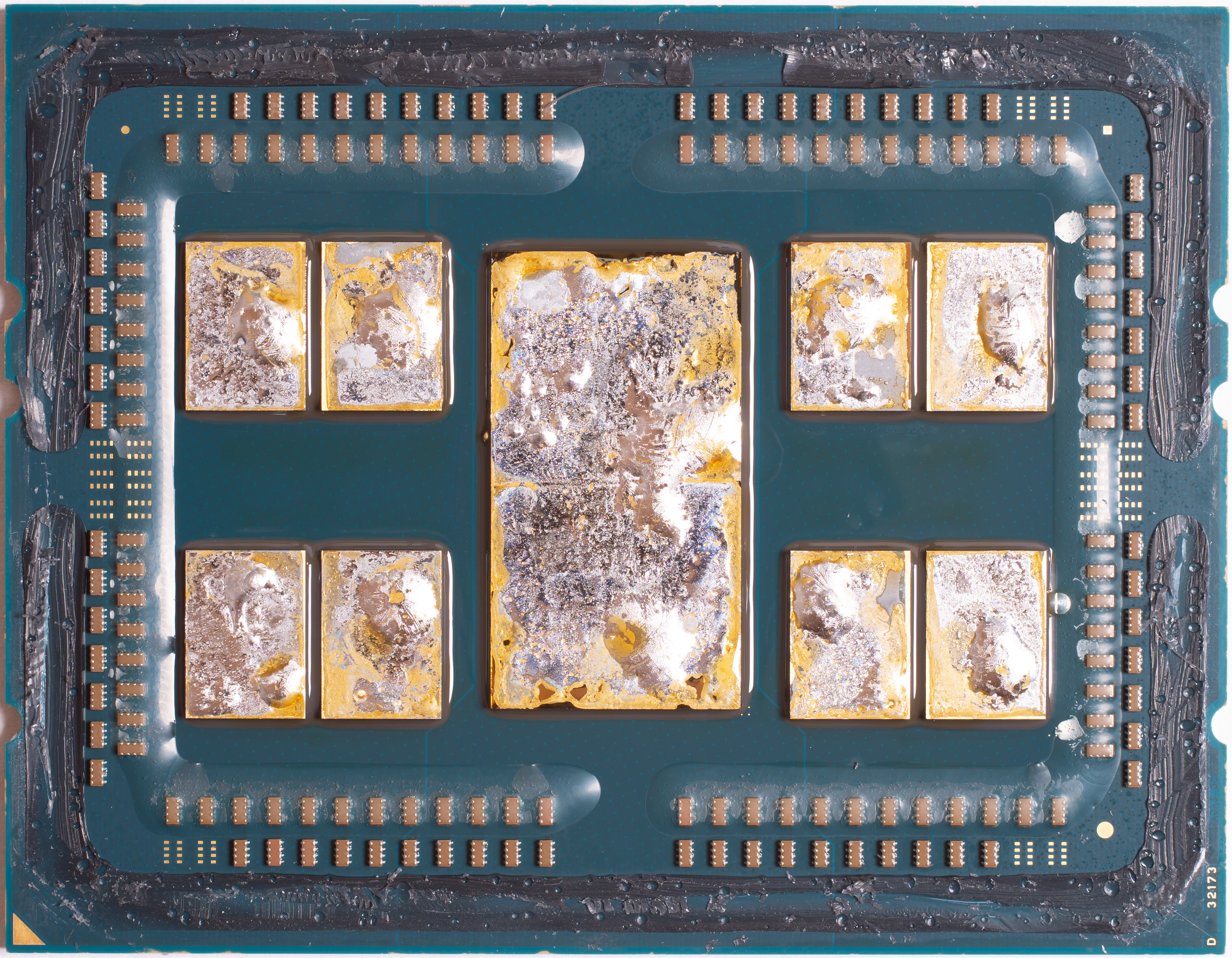
A delidded AMD 7702 featuring 8 CCDs and 1 I/O die, with remains of the solder thermal interface material (TIM) on the chiplets

== See also ==
- Jim Keller (engineer)
- Manycore processor

Turion / ULV		Node range label	x86			
Microarchi.	Step	Node range label	Microarchi.	Step		
		180 nm	K7	Athlon Classic		
		180 nm	K7	Thunderbird		
		180 nm	K7	Palomino		
		130 nm	K7	Thoroughbred		
		130 nm	K7	Barton/Thorton		
		130 nm	K8	ClawHammer		
		130 nm	K8	Newcastle		
		130 nm	K8	SledgeHammer		
K8L	Lancaster	90 nm	K8	Winchester	K8(×2)	K9
K8L	Richmond	90 nm	K8	San Diego	Toledo	~~Greyhound~~
K8L	Taylor / Trinidad	90 nm	K8	San Diego	Windsor	
K8L	Tyler	65 nm	K8	Orleans	Brisbane	
K8L	Lion	65 nm	K10	Phenom	4 cores on mainstream desktop, DDR3 introduced	
K8L	Caspian	45 nm	K10	Phenom II / Athlon II	6 cores on mainstream desktop	
14h	Bobcat	40 nm				
		32 nm	K10	Lynx		
		32 nm	K10	Llano	APU introduced; CPU and GPU on single die	
		32 nm	Bulldozer 15h	Bulldozer	8 cores on mainstream desktop	
		32 nm	Bulldozer 15h	Piledriver		
16h	Jaguar	28 nm	Bulldozer 15h	Steamroller	APU/mobile-only	
16h	Puma	28 nm	Bulldozer 15h	Excavator	APU/mobile-only, DDR4 introduced	
K12	~~K12 (ARM64)~~	14 nm	Zen	Zen	SMT introduced	
		12 nm	Zen	Zen+		
		7 nm	Zen	Zen 2	12 and 16 cores on mainstream desktop, chiplet design	
		7 nm	Zen	Zen 3	3D V-Cache variants introduced	
		6 nm	Zen	Zen 3+	Mobile-only, DDR5 introduced	
		5 nm / 4 nm	Zen	Zen 4	High core density "Cloud" (Zen xc) variants introduced	
		4 nm / 3 nm	Zen	Zen 5	Ryzen AI NPU cores introduced	
		3 nm / 2 nm	Zen	Zen 6		
		16A / 14A	Zen	Zen 7		
