= John Wawrzynek =

American computer scientist

- Citizenship: US
- Education: California Institute of Technology; University of Illinois at Urbana–Champaign; University at Buffalo
- Scientific career
- Fields: Computer Architecture; Reconfigurable Computing; Integrated Circuit
- Workplaces: University of California, Berkeley
- Thesis: VLSI Concurrent Computation for Music Synthesis (1987)
- Doctoral advisor: Carver Mead

John Wawrzynek is Professor of Electrical Engineering and Computer Sciences at the University of California at Berkeley. He holds a joint appointment with Lawrence Berkeley National Laboratory and is the Chief Faculty Director of the Berkeley Wireless Research Center. He is currently a principal researcher in multiple large research centers at UC Berkeley including Algorithms and Specializers for Provably Optimal Implementations with Resilience and Efficiency (ASPIRE), the Parallel Computing Laboratory (ParLab), and the TerraSwarm Research Center.
