= List of AMD processors with 3D graphics =

This is a list of microprocessors designed by AMD containing a 3D integrated graphics processing unit (iGPU), including those under the AMD APU (Accelerated Processing Unit) product series.

== Features overview ==
The following table shows features of AMD's processors with 3D graphics, including APUs.

Platform			High, standard and low power														Low and ultra-low power								
Codename	Server	Basic						Toronto																	
Codename	Server	Micro																Kyoto							
Codename	Desktop	Performance													Raphael	Phoenix									
Codename	Desktop	Mainstream	Llano	Trinity	Richland	Kaveri	Kaveri Refresh (Godavari)	Carrizo	Bristol Ridge	Raven Ridge	Picasso	Renoir	Cezanne		Raphael	Phoenix									
Codename	Desktop	Entry	Llano	Trinity	Richland	Kaveri	Kaveri Refresh (Godavari)	Carrizo	Bristol Ridge	Raven Ridge	Picasso	Renoir	Cezanne			Phoenix									
Codename	Desktop	Basic																Kabini				Dalí			
Codename	Mobile	Performance										Renoir	Cezanne	Rembrandt	Dragon Range										
Codename	Mobile	Mainstream	Llano	Trinity	Richland	Kaveri		Carrizo	Bristol Ridge	Raven Ridge	Picasso	Renoir Lucienne	Cezanne Barceló	Rembrandt	Dragon Range	Phoenix									
Codename	Mobile	Entry	Llano	Trinity	Richland	Kaveri		Carrizo	Bristol Ridge	Raven Ridge												Dalí			Mendocino
Codename	Mobile	Basic															Desna, Ontario, Zacate	Kabini, Temash	Beema, Mullins	Carrizo-L	Stoney Ridge	Dalí	Pollock		Mendocino
Codename	Embedded			Trinity		Bald Eagle		Merlin Falcon, Brown Falcon		Great Horned Owl		Grey Hawk					Ontario, Zacate	Kabini	Steppe Eagle, Crowned Eagle, LX-Family		Prairie Falcon	Banded Kestrel		River Hawk	
Released			Aug 2011	Oct 2012	Jun 2013	Jan 2014	2015	Jun 2015	Jun 2016	Oct 2017	Jan 2019	Mar 2020	Jan 2021	Jan 2022	Sep 2022	Jan 2023	Jan 2011	May 2013	Apr 2014	May 2015	Feb 2016	Apr 2019	Jul 2020	Jun 2022	Nov 2022
CPU microarchitecture			K10	Piledriver		Steamroller		Excavator	"Excavator+"	Zen	Zen+	Zen 2	Zen 3	Zen 3+	Zen 4		Bobcat	Jaguar	Puma	Puma+	"Excavator+"	Zen		Zen+	"Zen 2+"
ISA			x86-64 v1	x86-64 v2				x86-64 v3							x86-64 v4		x86-64 v1	x86-64 v2			x86-64 v3				
Socket	Desktop	Performance	—N/a												AM5	—N/a	—N/a								
Socket	Desktop	Mainstream	—N/a					AM4						—N/a	AM5	—N/a	—N/a								
Socket	Desktop	Entry	FM1	FM2		FM2+		FM2+ (Note: For FM2+ Excavator models: A8-7680, A6-7480 & Athlon X4 845.), AM4	AM4					—N/a			—N/a								
Socket	Desktop	Basic	—N/a														—N/a	AM1	—N/a			FP5	—N/a		
Socket	Other		FS1	FS1+, FP2		FP3		FP4		FP5		FP6		FP7	FL1	FP7; FP7r2; FP8	FT1	FT3	FT3b		FP4	FP5	FT5	FP5	FT6
PCI Express version			2.0			3.0								4.0	5.0	4.0	2.0				3.0				
CXL			—N/a														—N/a								
Fab. (nm)			GF 32SHP (HKMG SOI)			GF 28SHP (HKMG bulk)				GF 14LPP (FinFET bulk)	GF 12LP (FinFET bulk)	TSMC N7 (FinFET bulk)		TSMC N6 (FinFET bulk)	CCD: TSMC N5 (FinFET bulk) cIOD: TSMC N6 (FinFET bulk)	TSMC 4nm (FinFET bulk)	TSMC N40 (bulk)	TSMC N28 (HKMG bulk)	GF 28SHP (HKMG bulk)			GF 14LPP (FinFET bulk)		GF 12LP (FinFET bulk)	TSMC N6 (FinFET bulk)
Die area (mm^{2})			228	246		245		245	250	210		156	180	210	CCD: (2x) 70 cIOD: 122	178	75 (+ 28 FCH)	107		?	125	149			~100
Min TDP (W)			35	17				12				10		15	65	35	4.5	4	3.95	10	6			12	8
Max APU TDP (W)			100			95		65						45	170	54	18	25					6	54	15
Max stock APU base clock (GHz)			3	3.8	4.1	4.1		3.7	3.8	3.6	3.7	3.8	4.0	3.3	4.7	4.3	1.75	2.2	2	2.2	3.2	2.6	1.2	3.35	2.8
Max APUs per node (Note: A PC would be one node.)			1														1								
Max core dies per CPU			1												2	1	1								
Max CCX per core die			1									2	1				1								
Max cores per CCX			4										8				2	4			2			4	
Max CPU (Note: An APU combines a CPU and a GPU. Both have cores.) cores per APU			4									8			16	8	2	4			2			4	
Max threads per CPU core			1							2							1					2			
Integer pipeline structure			3+3	2+2						4+2		4+2+1	1+3+3+1+2				1+1+1+1				2+2	4+2			4+2+1
i386, i486, i586, CMOV, NOPL, i686, PAE, NX bit, CMPXCHG16B, AMD-V, RVI, ABM, and 64-bit LAHF/SAHF			Yes														Yes								
IOMMU (Note: Requires firmware support.)			—N/a	v2													v1		v2						
BMI1, AES-NI, CLMUL, and F16C			—N/a	Yes													—N/a	Yes							
MOVBE			—N/a					Yes									—N/a	Yes							
AVIC, BMI2, RDRAND, and MWAITX/MONITORX			—N/a					Yes									—N/a				Yes				
SME (Note: Requires firmware support.), TSME, ADX, SHA, RDSEED, SMAP, SMEP, XSAVEC, XSAVES, XRSTORS, CLFLUSHOPT, CLZERO, and PTE Coalescing			—N/a							Yes							—N/a					Yes			
GMET, WBNOINVD, CLWB, QOS, PQE-BW, RDPID, RDPRU, and MCOMMIT			—N/a									Yes					—N/a								Yes
MPK, VAES			—N/a										Yes				—N/a								
SGX			—N/a														—N/a								
FPUs per core			1	0.5						1							1				0.5	1			
Pipes per FPU			2														2								
FPU pipe width			128-bit									256-bit					80-bit	128-bit							256-bit
CPU instruction set SIMD level			SSE4a (Note: No SSE4. No SSSE3.)	AVX				AVX2							AVX-512		SSSE3	AVX			AVX2				
3DNow!			3DNow!+	—N/a													—N/a								
PREFETCH/PREFETCHW			Yes														Yes								
GFNI			—N/a												Yes		—N/a								
AMX			—N/a														—N/a								
FMA4, LWP, TBM, and XOP			—N/a	Yes						—N/a							—N/a				Yes	—N/a			
FMA3			—N/a	Yes													—N/a				Yes				
AMD XDNA			—N/a													Yes	—N/a								
L1 data cache per core (KiB)			64	16				32									32								
L1 data cache associativity (ways)			2	4				8									8								
L1 instruction caches per core			1	0.5						1							1				0.5	1			
Max APU total L1 instruction cache (KiB)			256	128		192				256					512	256	64		128		96	128			
L1 instruction cache associativity (ways)			2			3				4		8					2				3	4			8
L2 caches per core			1	0.5						1							1				0.5	1			
Max APU total L2 cache (MiB)			4					2				4			16		1	2			1			2	
L2 cache associativity (ways)			16							8							16					8			
Max on-die L3 cache per CCX (MiB)			—N/a							4			16		32		—N/a						4		
Max 3D V-Cache per CCD (MiB)			—N/a							—N/a					64	—N/a	—N/a						—N/a		
Max total in-CCD L3 cache per APU (MiB)			—N/a							4		8	16		64		—N/a						4		
Max. total 3D V-Cache per APU (MiB)			—N/a							—N/a					64	—N/a	—N/a						—N/a		
Max. board L3 cache per APU (MiB)			—N/a							—N/a							—N/a						—N/a		
Max total L3 cache per APU (MiB)			—N/a							4		8	16		128		—N/a						4		
APU L3 cache associativity (ways)			—N/a							16							—N/a						16		
L3 cache scheme			—N/a							Victim							—N/a						Victim		
Max. L4 cache			—N/a														—N/a								
Max stock DRAM support			DDR3-1866		DDR3-2133			DDR3-2133, DDR4-2400	DDR4-2400	DDR4-2933		DDR4-3200, LPDDR4-4266		DDR5-4800, LPDDR5-6400	DDR5-5200	DDR5-5600, LPDDR5x-7500	DDR3L-1333	DDR3L-1600	DDR3L-1866		DDR3-1866, DDR4-2400	DDR4-2400	DDR4-1600	DDR4-3200	LPDDR5-5500
Max DRAM channels per APU			2														1					2	1	2	
Max stock DRAM bandwidth (GB/s) per APU			29.866		34.132			38.400		46.932		68.256		102.400	83.200	120.000	10.666	12.800	14.933		19.200	38.400	12.800	51.200	88.000
GPU microarchitecture			TeraScale 2 (VLIW5)	TeraScale 3 (VLIW4)		GCN 2nd gen		GCN 3rd gen		GCN 5th gen				RDNA 2		RDNA 3	TeraScale 2 (VLIW5)	GCN 2nd gen			GCN 3rd gen	GCN 5th gen			RDNA 2
GPU instruction set			TeraScale instruction set			GCN instruction set								RDNA instruction set			TeraScale instruction set	GCN instruction set							RDNA instruction set
Max stock GPU base clock (MHz)			600	800	844	866		1108		1250	1400	2100		2400	400		538	600	?	847	900	1200	600	1300	1900
Max stock GPU base GFLOPS (Note: Single-precision performance is calculated from the base (or boost) core clock speed based on a FMA operation.)			480	614.4	648.1	886.7		1134.5		1760	1971.2	2150.4		3686.4	102.4		86	?	?	?	345.6	460.8	230.4	1331.2	486.4
3D engine (Note: Unified shaders : texture mapping units : render output units)			Up to 400:20:8	Up to 384:24:6		Up to 512:32:8				Up to 704:44:16		Up to 512:32:8		768:48:8	128:8:4		80:8:4	128:8:4			Up to 192:12:8	Up to 192:12:4	192:12:4	Up to 512:?:?	128:?:?
3D engine			IOMMUv1			IOMMUv2											IOMMUv1		?		IOMMUv2				
Video decoder			UVD 3.0			UVD 4.2		UVD 6.0		VCN 1.0		VCN 2.1	VCN 2.2	VCN 3.1		?	UVD 3.0	UVD 4.0	UVD 4.2		UVD 6.2	VCN 1.0			VCN 3.1
Video encoder			—N/a	VCE 1.0		VCE 2.0		VCE 3.1		VCN 1.0		VCN 2.1	VCN 2.2	VCN 3.1		?	—N/a	VCE 2.0			VCE 3.4	VCN 1.0			VCN 3.1
AMD Fluid Motion			No			Yes				No							No		Yes			No			
GPU power saving			PowerPlay	PowerTune													PowerPlay	PowerTune							
TrueAudio			—N/a			Yes							?				—N/a	Yes							
FreeSync			—N/a			1; 2											—N/a	1; 2							
HDCP (Note: To play protected video content, it also requires card, operating system, driver, and application support. A compatible HDCP display is also needed for this. HDCP is mandatory for the output of certain audio formats, placing additional constraints on the multimedia setup.)			?			1.4				2.2				2.3			?	1.4				2.2			2.3
PlayReady			—N/a							3.0 not yet							—N/a					3.0 not yet			
Supported displays (Note: To feed more than two displays, the additional panels must have native DisplayPort support. Alternatively active DisplayPort-to-DVI/HDMI/VGA adapters can be employed.)			2–3	2–4				3		3 (desktop); 4 (mobile, embedded)		4					2				3	4		4	
/drm/radeon (Note: DRM (Direct Rendering Manager) is a component of the Linux kernel. Support in this table refers to the most current version.)			Yes						—N/a								Yes				—N/a				
/drm/amdgpu			—N/a			Yes											—N/a	Yes							

== Graphics API overview ==
The following table shows the graphics and compute APIs support across ATI/AMD GPU microarchitectures. Note that a branding series might include older generation chips.

Chip series	Microarchitecture	Fab	Supported APIs					AMD support	Year introduced	Introduced with
Chip series	Microarchitecture	Fab	Rendering			Computing / ROCm		AMD support	Year introduced	Introduced with
Chip series	Microarchitecture	Fab	Vulkan	OpenGL	Direct3D	HSA	OpenCL	AMD support	Year introduced	Introduced with
Wonder	Fixed-pipeline (Note: Radeon 7000 Series has programmable pixel shaders, but do not fully comply with DirectX 8 or Pixel Shader 1.0. See article on R100's pixel shaders.)	1000 nm 800 nm	—N/a	—N/a	—N/a	—N/a	—N/a	Ended	1986	Graphics Solutions
Mach	Fixed-pipeline	800 nm 600 nm	—N/a	—N/a	—N/a	—N/a	—N/a	Ended	1991	Mach8
3D Rage	Fixed-pipeline	500 nm	—N/a	—N/a	5.0	—N/a	—N/a	Ended	1996	3D Rage
Rage Pro	Fixed-pipeline	350 nm	—N/a	1.1	6.0	—N/a	—N/a	Ended	1997	Rage Pro
Rage 128	Fixed-pipeline	250 nm	—N/a	1.2	6.0	—N/a	—N/a	Ended	1998	Rage 128 GL/VR
R100	Fixed-pipeline	180 nm 150 nm	—N/a	1.3	7.0	—N/a	—N/a	Ended	2000	Radeon
R200	Programmable pixel & vertex pipelines	150 nm	—N/a	1.3	8.1	—N/a	—N/a	Ended	2001	Radeon 8500
R300	Programmable pixel & vertex pipelines	150 nm 130 nm 110 nm	—N/a	2.0 (Note: These series do not fully comply with OpenGL 2+ as the hardware does not support all types of non-power-of-two (NPOT) textures.)	9.0; 11 (FL 9_2)	—N/a	—N/a	Ended	2002	Radeon 9700
R420	Programmable pixel & vertex pipelines	130 nm 110 nm	—N/a	2.0	9.0b 11 (FL 9_2)	—N/a	—N/a	Ended	2004	Radeon X800
R520	Programmable pixel & vertex pipelines	90 nm 80 nm	—N/a	2.0	9.0c 11 (FL 9_3)	—N/a	—N/a	Ended	2005	Radeon X1800
R600	TeraScale 1	80 nm 65 nm	—N/a	3.3	10.0; 11 (FL 10_0)	—N/a	ATI Stream	Ended	2007	Radeon HD 2900 XT
RV670	TeraScale 1	55 nm	—N/a	3.3	10.1; 11 (FL 10_1)	—N/a	ATI Stream APP	Ended	2007	Radeon HD 3850/3870
RV770	TeraScale 1	55 nm 40 nm	—N/a	3.3	10.1; 11 (FL 10_1)	—N/a	1.0	Ended	2008	Radeon HD 4850/4870
Evergreen	TeraScale 2	40 nm	—N/a	4.5 (Linux 4.2-4.6) (Note: OpenGL 4+ compliance requires supporting FP64 shaders and these are emulated on some TeraScale chips using 32-bit hardware.)	11 (FL 11_0)	—N/a	1.2	Ended	2009	Radeon HD 5850/5870
Northern Islands	TeraScale 2 TeraScale 3	40 nm	—N/a	4.5 (Linux 4.2-4.6)	11 (FL 11_0)	—N/a	1.2	Ended	2010	Radeon HD 6850/6870; Radeon HD 6950/6970
Southern Islands	GCN 1^{st} gen	28 nm	1.0 (Windows) 1.3 (Linux)	4.6	11 (FL 11_1); 12 (FL11_1)	Yes	1.2; 2.0 possible	Ended	2012	Radeon HD 7950/7970
Sea Islands	GCN 2^{nd} gen	28 nm	1.2 (Windows) 1.3 (Linux)	4.6	11 (FL 12_0); 12 (FL 12_0)	Yes	2.0 (1.2 in MacOS, Linux); 2.1 Beta in Linux ROCm; 2.2 possible	Ended	2013	Radeon HD 7790
Volcanic Islands	GCN 3^{rd} gen	28 nm	1.2 (Windows) 1.4 (Linux)	4.6	11 (FL 12_0); 12 (FL 12_0)	Yes	2.0 (1.2 in MacOS, Linux); 2.1 Beta in Linux ROCm; 2.2 possible	Ended	2014	Radeon R9 285
Arctic Islands	GCN 4^{th} gen	28 nm 14 nm	1.3 (Windows) 1.4 (Linux)	4.6	11 (FL 12_0); 12 (FL 12_0)	Yes	2.0 (1.2 in MacOS, Linux); 2.1 Beta in Linux ROCm; 2.2 possible	Supported	2016	Radeon RX 480
Polaris	GCN 4^{th} gen	28 nm 14 nm	1.3 (Windows) 1.4 (Linux)	4.6	11 (FL 12_0); 12 (FL 12_0)	Yes	2.0 (1.2 in MacOS, Linux); 2.1 Beta in Linux ROCm; 2.2 possible	Supported	2017	Radeon 520/530; Radeon RX 530/550/570/580
Vega	GCN 5^{th} gen	14 nm 7 nm	1.3 (Windows) 1.4 (Linux)	4.6	11 (FL 12_1); 12 (FL 12_1)	Yes	2.0 (1.2 in MacOS, Linux); 2.1 Beta in Linux ROCm; 2.2 possible	Supported	2017	Radeon Vega Frontier Edition
Navi	RDNA	7 nm	1.4	4.6	11 (FL 12_1); 12 (FL 12_1)	Yes	2.0 (1.2 in MacOS, Linux); 2.1 Beta in Linux ROCm; 2.2 possible	Supported	2019	Radeon RX 5700 (XT)
Navi 2x	RDNA 2	7 nm 6 nm	1.4	4.6	11 (FL 12_1); 12 (FL 12_2)	Yes	2.0 (1.2 in MacOS, Linux); 2.1 Beta in Linux ROCm; 2.2 possible	Supported	2020	Radeon RX 6800 (XT)
Navi 3x	RDNA 3	6 nm 5 nm	1.4	4.6	11 (FL 12_1); 12 (FL 12_2)	Yes	2.0 (1.2 in MacOS, Linux); 2.1 Beta in Linux ROCm; 2.2 possible	Supported	2022	Radeon RX 7900 XT(X)
Navi 4x	RDNA 4	4 nm	1.4	4.6	11 (FL 12_1); 12 (FL 12_2)	Yes	2.0 (1.2 in MacOS, Linux); 2.1 Beta in Linux ROCm; 2.2 possible	Supported	2025	Radeon RX 9070 (XT)

== Desktop processors with 3D graphics ==
=== APU or Radeon Graphics branded ===
==== Lynx: "Llano" (2011) ====
- Socket FM1
- CPU: K10 (also Husky or K10.5) cores with an upgraded Stars architecture, no L3 cache
  - L1 cache: 64 KB Data per core and 64 KB Instruction cache per core
  - L2 cache: 512 KB on dual-core, 1 MB on tri- and quad-core models
  - MMX, Enhanced 3DNow!, SSE, SSE2, SSE3, SSE4a, ABM, NX bit, AMD64, Cool'n'Quiet, AMD-V
- GPU: TeraScale 2 (Evergreen); all A and E series models feature Redwood-class integrated graphics on die (BeaverCreek for the dual-core variants and WinterPark for the quad-core variants). Sempron and Athlon models exclude integrated graphics.
- List of embedded GPU's
- Support for up to four DIMMs of up to DDR3-1866 memory
- Fabrication 32 nm on GlobalFoundries SOI process; Die size: 228 mm^{2}, with 1.178 billion transistors
- 5 GT/s UMI
- Integrated PCIe 2.0 controller
- Select models support Turbo Core technology for faster CPU operation when the thermal specification permits
- Select models support Hybrid Graphics technology to assist a discrete Radeon HD 6450, 6570, or 6670 discrete graphics card. This is similar to the Hybrid CrossFireX technology available in the AMD 700 and 800 chipset series

Model (Note: Models with "K" suffixes feature an unlocked multiplier and overclockable GPU.)	Released	Fab	Step.	CPU					GPU				DDR3 memory support	TDP (W)	Box number	Part number
Model	Released	Fab	Step.	Cores (threads)	Clock rate (GHz)		Cache (Note: AMD in its technical documentation uses KB, which it defines as Kilobyte and as equal to 1024 bytes, and MB, which it defines as Megabyte and as equal to 1024 KB.)		Model	Config	Clock (MHz)	Processing power (GFLOPS) (Note: Single-precision performance is calculated from the base (or boost) core clock speed based on a FMA operation.)	DDR3 memory support	TDP (W)	Box number	Part number
Model	Released	Fab	Step.	Cores (threads)	Base	Boost	L1	L2	Model	Config	Clock (MHz)	Processing power (GFLOPS)	DDR3 memory support	TDP (W)	Box number	Part number
Sempron X2 198	2012	32 nm SOI	LN-B0	2 (2)	2.5	—N/a	64 KB inst. 64 KB data per core	2×512 KB	—N/a				1600	65	SD198XOJGXBOX	SD198XOJZ22GX
Athlon II X2 221	2012	32 nm SOI	LN-B0	2 (2)	2.8	—N/a	64 KB inst. 64 KB data per core	2×512 KB	—N/a				1600	65	AD221XOJGXBOX	AD221XOJZ22GX
Athlon II X4 631	2012	32 nm SOI	LN-B0	4 (4)	2.6	—N/a	64 KB inst. 64 KB data per core	4×1 MB	—N/a				1866	65	AD631XOJGXBOX	AD631XOJZ43GX
Athlon II X4 631	Aug 15, 2011	32 nm SOI	LN-B0	4 (4)	2.6	—N/a	64 KB inst. 64 KB data per core	4×1 MB	—N/a				1866	100	AD631XOJGXBOX	AD631XWNZ43GX
Athlon II X4 638	Feb 8, 2012	32 nm SOI	LN-B0	4 (4)	2.7	—N/a	64 KB inst. 64 KB data per core	4×1 MB	—N/a				1866	65	AD638XOJGXBOX	AD638XOJZ43GX
Athlon II X4 641	Feb 8, 2012	32 nm SOI	LN-B0	4 (4)	2.8	—N/a	64 KB inst. 64 KB data per core	4×1 MB	—N/a				1866	100	AD641XWNGXBOX	AD641XWNZ43GX
Athlon II X4 651	Nov 14, 2011	32 nm SOI	LN-B0	4 (4)	3.0	—N/a	64 KB inst. 64 KB data per core	4×1 MB	—N/a				1866	100	AD651XWNGXBOX	AD651XWNZ43GX
Athlon II X4 651K	2012	32 nm SOI	LN-B0	4 (4)	3.0	—N/a	64 KB inst. 64 KB data per core	4×1 MB	—N/a				1866	100	AD651KWNGXBOX	AD651KWNZ43GX
E2-3200	2011	32 nm SOI	LN-B0	2 (2)	2.4	—N/a	64 KB inst. 64 KB data per core	2×512 KB	HD 6370D	160:8:4	443	141.7	1600	65	ED3200OJGXBOX	ED3200OJZ22GX; ED3200OJZ22HX
A4-3300	Sep 7, 2011	32 nm SOI	LN-B0	2 (2)	2.5	—N/a	64 KB inst. 64 KB data per core	2×512 KB	HD 6410D	160:8:4	443	141.7	1600	65	AD3300OJGXBOX; AD3300OJHXBOX	AD3300OJZ22GX; AD3300OJZ22HX
A4-3400	Sep 7, 2011	32 nm SOI	LN-B0	2 (2)	2.7	—N/a	64 KB inst. 64 KB data per core	2×512 KB	HD 6410D	160:8:4	600	192	1600	65	AD3400OJGXBOX; AD3400OJHXBOX	AD3400OJZ22GX; AD3400OJZ22HX
A4-3420	Dec 20, 2011	32 nm SOI	LN-B0	2 (2)	2.8	—N/a	64 KB inst. 64 KB data per core	2×512 KB	HD 6410D	160:8:4	600	192	1600	65	—N/a	AD3420OJZ22HX
A6-3500	Aug 17, 2011	32 nm SOI	LN-B0	3 (3)	2.1	2.4	64 KB inst. 64 KB data per core	3×1 MB	HD 6530D	320:16:8	443	283.5	1866	65	AD3500OJGXBOX	AD3500OJZ33GX
A6-3600	Aug 17, 2011	32 nm SOI	LN-B0	4 (4)	2.1	2.4	64 KB inst. 64 KB data per core	4×1 MB	HD 6530D	320:16:8	443	283.5	1866	65	AD3600OJGXBOX	AD3600OJZ43GX
A6-3620	Dec 20, 2011	32 nm SOI	LN-B0	4 (4)	2.2	2.5	64 KB inst. 64 KB data per core	4×1 MB	HD 6530D	320:16:8	443	283.5	1866	65	AD3620OJGXBOX	AD3620OJZ43GX
A6-3650	Jun 30, 2011	32 nm SOI	LN-B0	4 (4)	2.6	—N/a	64 KB inst. 64 KB data per core	4×1 MB	HD 6530D	320:16:8	443	283.5	1866	100	AD3650WNGXBOX	AD3650WNZ43GX
A6-3670K	Dec 20, 2011	32 nm SOI	LN-B0	4 (4)	2.7	—N/a	64 KB inst. 64 KB data per core	4×1 MB	HD 6530D	320:16:8	443	283.5	1866	100	AD3670WNGXBOX	AD3670WNZ43GX
A8-3800	Aug 17, 2011	32 nm SOI	LN-B0	4 (4)	2.4	2.7	64 KB inst. 64 KB data per core	4×1 MB	HD 6550D	400:20:8	600	480	1866	65	AD3800OJGXBOX	AD3800OJZ43GX
A8-3820	Dec 20, 2011	32 nm SOI	LN-B0	4 (4)	2.5	2.8	64 KB inst. 64 KB data per core	4×1 MB	HD 6550D	400:20:8	600	480	1866	65	AD3820OJGXBOX	AD3820OJZ43GX
A8-3850	Jun 30, 2011	32 nm SOI	LN-B0	4 (4)	2.9	—N/a	64 KB inst. 64 KB data per core	4×1 MB	HD 6550D	400:20:8	600	480	1866	100	AD3850WNGXBOX	AD3850WNZ43GX
A8-3870K	Dec 20, 2011	32 nm SOI	LN-B0	4 (4)	3.0	—N/a	64 KB inst. 64 KB data per core	4×1 MB	HD 6550D	400:20:8	600	480	1866	100	AD3870WNGXBOX	AD3870WNZ43GX

==== Virgo: "Trinity" (2012) ====
- Fabrication 32 nm on GlobalFoundries SOI process
- Socket FM2
- CPU: Piledriver
  - L1 Cache: 16 KB Data per core and 64 KB Instructions per module
- GPU TeraScale 3 (VLIW4)
- Die Size: 246 mm^{2}, 1.303 Billion transistors
- Support for up to four DIMMs of up to DDR3-1866 memory
- 5 GT/s UMI
- GPU (based on VLIW4 architecture) instruction support: DirectX 11, Opengl 4.2, DirectCompute, Pixel Shader 5.0, Blu-ray 3D, OpenCL 1.2, AMD Stream, UVD3
- Integrated PCIe 2.0 controller, and Turbo Core technology for faster CPU/GPU operation when the thermal specification permits
- MMX, SSE, SSE2, SSE3, SSSE3, SSE4a, SSE4.1, SSE4.2, AMD64, AMD-V, AES, CLMUL, AVX, XOP, FMA3, FMA4, F16C, ABM, BMI1, TBM
- Sempron and Athlon models exclude integrated graphics
- Select models support Hybrid Graphics technology to assist a Radeon HD 7350, 7450, 7470, 7550, 7570, 7670 discrete graphics card. However, it has been found that this does not always improve 3D accelerated graphics performance.

Model	Released	Fab	Step.	CPU					GPU				DDR3 memory support	TDP (W)	Box number	Part number
Model	Released	Fab	Step.	[Modules/FPUs] Cores/threads	Clock rate (GHz)		Cache (Note: AMD in its technical documentation uses KB, which it defines as Kilobyte and as equal to 1024 bytes, and MB, which it defines as Megabyte and as equal to 1024 KB.)		Model	Config	Clock (MHz)	Processing power (GFLOPS) (Note: Single-precision performance is calculated from the base (or boost) core clock speed based on a FMA operation.)	DDR3 memory support	TDP (W)	Box number	Part number
Model	Released	Fab	Step.	[Modules/FPUs] Cores/threads	Base	Boost	L1	L2	Model	Config	Clock (MHz)	Processing power (GFLOPS)	DDR3 memory support	TDP (W)	Box number	Part number
Sempron X2 240		32 nm	TN-A1	[1]2	2.9	3.3	64 KB inst. per module 16 KB data per core	1 MB	—N/a				1600	65		SD240XOKA23HJ
Athlon X2 340	Oct 2012	32 nm	TN-A1	[1]2	3.2	3.6	64 KB inst. per module 16 KB data per core	1 MB	—N/a				1600	65		AD340XOKA23HJ
Athlon X4 730	Oct 1, 2012	32 nm	TN-A1	[2]4	2.8	3.2	64 KB inst. per module 16 KB data per core	2×2 MB	—N/a				1866	65		AD730XOKA44HJ
Athlon X4 740	Oct 2012	32 nm	TN-A1	[2]4	3.2	3.7	64 KB inst. per module 16 KB data per core	2×2 MB	—N/a				1866	65	AD740XOKHJBOX	AD740XOKA44HJ
Athlon X4 750K	Oct 2012	32 nm	TN-A1	[2]4	3.4	4.0	64 KB inst. per module 16 KB data per core	2×2 MB	—N/a				1866	100	AD750KWOHJBOX	AD750KWOA44HJ
FirePro A300	Aug 7, 2012	32 nm	TN-A1	[2]4	3.4	4.0	64 KB inst. per module 16 KB data per core	2×2 MB	FirePro	384:24:8; 6 CU	760	583.6	1866	65		AWA300OKA44HJ
FirePro A320	Aug 7, 2012	32 nm	TN-A1	[2]4	3.8	4.2	64 KB inst. per module 16 KB data per core	2×2 MB	FirePro	384:24:8; 6 CU	800	614.4	1866	100		AWA320WOA44HJ
A4-5300	Oct 1, 2012	32 nm	TN-A1	[1]2	3.4	3.6	64 KB inst. per module 16 KB data per core	1 MB	HD 7480D	128:8:4; 2 CU	723	185	1600	65	AD5300OKHJBOX	AD5300OKA23HJ
A4-5300B	Oct 2012	32 nm	TN-A1	[1]2	3.4	3.6	64 KB inst. per module 16 KB data per core	1 MB	HD 7480D	128:8:4; 2 CU	723	185	1600	65		AD530BOKA23HJ
A6-5400K	Oct 1, 2012	32 nm	TN-A1	[1]2	3.6	3.8	64 KB inst. per module 16 KB data per core	1 MB	HD 7540D	192:12:4; 3 CU	760	291.8	1866	65	AD540KOKHJBOX	AD540KOKA23HJ
A6-5400B	Oct 2012	32 nm	TN-A1	[1]2	3.6	3.8	64 KB inst. per module 16 KB data per core	1 MB	HD 7540D	192:12:4; 3 CU	760	291.8	1866	65		AD540BOKA23HJ
A8-5500	Oct 1, 2012	32 nm	TN-A1	[2]4	3.2	3.7	64 KB inst. per module 16 KB data per core	2×2 MB	HD 7560D	256:16:8; 4 CU	760	389.1	1866	65	AD5500OKHJBOX	AD5500OKA44HJ
A8-5500B	Oct 2012	32 nm	TN-A1	[2]4	3.2	3.7	64 KB inst. per module 16 KB data per core	2×2 MB	HD 7560D	256:16:8; 4 CU	760	389.1	1866	65		AD550BOKA44HJ
A8-5600K	Oct 1, 2012	32 nm	TN-A1	[2]4	3.6	3.9	64 KB inst. per module 16 KB data per core	2×2 MB	HD 7560D	256:16:8; 4 CU	760	389.1	1866	100	AD560KWOHJBOX	AD560KWOA44HJ
A10-5700	Oct 1, 2012	32 nm	TN-A1	[2]4	3.4	4.0	64 KB inst. per module 16 KB data per core	2×2 MB	HD 7660D	384:24:8; 6 CU	760	583.6	1866	65	AD5700OKHJBOX	AD5700OKA44HJ
A10-5800K	Oct 1, 2012	32 nm	TN-A1	[2]4	3.8	4.2	64 KB inst. per module 16 KB data per core	2×2 MB	HD 7660D	384:24:8; 6 CU	800	614.4	1866	100	AD580KWOHJBOX	AD580KWOA44HJ
A10-5800B	Oct 2012	32 nm	TN-A1	[2]4	3.8	4.2	64 KB inst. per module 16 KB data per core	2×2 MB	HD 7660D	384:24:8; 6 CU	800	614.4	1866	100		AD580BWOA44HJ

==== "Richland" (2013) ====
- Fabrication 32 nm on GlobalFoundries SOI process
- Socket FM2
- Two or four CPU cores based on the Piledriver microarchitecture
  - Die Size: 246 mm^{2}, 1.303 Billion transistors
  - L1 Cache: 16 KB Data per core and 64 KB Instructions per module
  - MMX, SSE, SSE2, SSE3, SSSE3, SSE4a, SSE4.1, SSE4.2, AMD64, AMD-V, AES, AVX, XOP, FMA3, FMA4, F16C, ABM, BMI1, TBM, Turbo Core 3.0, NX bit, PowerNow!
- GPU
  - TeraScale 3 architecture
  - HD Media Accelerator, AMD Hybrid Graphics

Model	Released	Fab	Step.	CPU					GPU				DDR3 memory support	TDP (W)	Box number	Part number
Model	Released	Fab	Step.	[Modules/FPUs] Cores/threads	Clock rate (GHz)		Cache (Note: AMD in its technical documentation uses KB, which it defines as Kilobyte and as equal to 1024 bytes, and MB, which it defines as Megabyte and as equal to 1024 KB.)		Model	Config	Clock (MHz)	Processing power (GFLOPS) (Note: Single-precision performance is calculated from the base (or boost) core clock speed based on a FMA operation.)	DDR3 memory support	TDP (W)	Box number	Part number
Model	Released	Fab	Step.	[Modules/FPUs] Cores/threads	Base	Boost	L1	L2	Model	Config	Clock (MHz)	Processing power (GFLOPS)	DDR3 memory support	TDP (W)	Box number	Part number
Sempron X2 250		32 nm	RL-A1	[1]2	3.2	3.6	64 KB inst. per module 16 KB data per core	1 MB	—N/a					65		SD250XOKA23HL
Athlon X2 350		32 nm	RL-A1	[1]2	3.5	3.9	64 KB inst. per module 16 KB data per core	1 MB	—N/a				1866	65		AD350XOKA23HL
Athlon X2 370K	Jun 2013	32 nm	RL-A1	[1]2	4.0	4.2	64 KB inst. per module 16 KB data per core	1 MB	—N/a				1866	65	AD370KOKHLBOX	AD370KOKA23HL
Athlon X4 750	Oct 2013	32 nm	RL-A1	[2]4	3.4	4.0	64 KB inst. per module 16 KB data per core	2×2 MB	—N/a				1866	65		AD750XOKA44HL
Athlon X4 760K	Jun 2013	32 nm	RL-A1	[2]4	3.8	4.1	64 KB inst. per module 16 KB data per core	2×2 MB	—N/a				1866	100	AD760KWOHLBOX	AD760KWOA44HL
FX-670K	Mar 2014 (OEM)	32 nm	RL-A1	[2]4	3.7	4.3	64 KB inst. per module 16 KB data per core	2×2 MB	—N/a				1866	65		FD670KOKA44HL
A4-4000	May 2013	32 nm	RL-A1	[1]2	3.0	3.2	64 KB inst. per module 16 KB data per core	1 MB	HD 7480D	128:8:4; 2 CU	720	184.3	1333	65	AD4000OKHLBOX	AD4000OKA23HL
A4-4020	Jan 2014	32 nm	RL-A1	[1]2	3.2	3.4	64 KB inst. per module 16 KB data per core	1 MB	HD 7480D	128:8:4; 2 CU	720	184.3	1333	65	AD4020OKHLBOX	AD4020OKA23HL
A4-6300	Jul 2013	32 nm	RL-A1	[1]2	3.7	3.9	64 KB inst. per module 16 KB data per core	1 MB	HD 8370D	128:8:4; 2 CU	760	194.5	1600	65	AD6300OKHLBOX	AD6300OKA23HL
A4-6300B	Jul 2013	32 nm	RL-A1	[1]2	3.7	3.9	64 KB inst. per module 16 KB data per core	1 MB	HD 8370D	128:8:4; 2 CU	760	194.5	1600	65		AD630BOKA23HL
A4-6320	Dec 2013	32 nm	RL-A1	[1]2	3.8	4.0	64 KB inst. per module 16 KB data per core	1 MB	HD 8370D	128:8:4; 2 CU	760	194.5	1600	65	AD6320OKHLBOX	AD6320OKA23HL
A4-6320B	Mar 2014	32 nm	RL-A1	[1]2	3.8	4.0	64 KB inst. per module 16 KB data per core	1 MB	HD 8370D	128:8:4; 2 CU	760	194.5	1600	65		AD632BOKA23HL
A4-7300	Aug 2014	32 nm	RL-A1	[1]2	3.8	4.0	64 KB inst. per module 16 KB data per core	1 MB	HD 8470D	192:12:4; 3 CU	800	307.2	1600	65		AD7300OKA23HL
A4 Pro-7300B	Aug 2014	32 nm	RL-A1	[1]2	3.8	4.0	64 KB inst. per module 16 KB data per core	1 MB	HD 8470D	192:12:4; 3 CU	800	307.2	1600	65		AD730BOKA23HL
A6-6400B	Jun 4, 2013	32 nm	RL-A1	[1]2	3.9	4.1	64 KB inst. per module 16 KB data per core	1 MB	HD 8470D	192:12:4; 3 CU	800	307.2	1866	65		AD640BOKA23HL
A6-6400K	Jun 4, 2013	32 nm	RL-A1	[1]2	3.9	4.1	64 KB inst. per module 16 KB data per core	1 MB	HD 8470D	192:12:4; 3 CU	800	307.2	1866	65	AD640KOKHLBOX	AD640KOKA23HL
A6-6420B	Jan 2014	32 nm	RL-A1	[1]2	4.0	4.2	64 KB inst. per module 16 KB data per core	1 MB	HD 8470D	192:12:4; 3 CU	800	307.2	1866	65		AD642BOKA23HL
A6-6420K	Jan 2014	32 nm	RL-A1	[1]2	4.0	4.2	64 KB inst. per module 16 KB data per core	1 MB	HD 8470D	192:12:4; 3 CU	800	307.2	1866	65	AD642KOKHLBOX	AD642KOKA23HL
A8-6500T	Sep 18, 2013	32 nm	RL-A1	[2]4	2.1	3.1	64 KB inst. per module 16 KB data per core	2×2 MB	HD 8550D	256:16:8; 4 CU	720	368.6	1866	45	AD650TYHHLBOX	AD650TYHA44HL
A8-6500	Jun 4, 2013	32 nm	RL-A1	[2]4	3.5	4.1	64 KB inst. per module 16 KB data per core	2×2 MB	HD 8570D	256:16:8; 4 CU	800	409.6	1866	65	AD6500OKHLBOX	AD6500OKA44HL
A8-6500B	Jun 4, 2013	32 nm	RL-A1	[2]4	3.5	4.1	64 KB inst. per module 16 KB data per core	2×2 MB	HD 8570D	256:16:8; 4 CU	800	409.6	1866	65		AD650BOKA44HL
A8-6600K	Jun 4, 2013	32 nm	RL-A1	[2]4	3.9	4.2	64 KB inst. per module 16 KB data per core	2×2 MB	HD 8570D	256:16:8; 4 CU	844	432.1	1866	100	AD660KWOHLBOX	AD660KWOA44HL
A10-6700T	Sep 18, 2013	32 nm	RL-A1	[2]4	2.5	3.5	64 KB inst. per module 16 KB data per core	2×2 MB	HD 8650D	384:24:8; 6 CU	720	552.9	1866	45	AD670TYHHLBOX	AD670TYHA44HL
A10-6700	Jun 4, 2013	32 nm	RL-A1	[2]4	3.7	4.3	64 KB inst. per module 16 KB data per core	2×2 MB	HD 8670D	384:24:8; 6 CU	844	648.1	1866	65	AD6700OKHLBOX	AD6700OKA44HL
A10-6790B	Oct 29, 2013	32 nm	RL-A1	[2]4	4.0	4.3	64 KB inst. per module 16 KB data per core	2×2 MB	HD 8670D	384:24:8; 6 CU	844	648.1	1866	100	AD679KWOHLBOX	AD679KWOA44HL
A10-6790K	Oct 28, 2013	32 nm	RL-A1	[2]4	4.0	4.3	64 KB inst. per module 16 KB data per core	2×2 MB	HD 8670D	384:24:8; 6 CU	844	648.1	1866	100		AD679BWOA44HL
A10-6800K	Jun 4, 2013	32 nm	RL-A1	[2]4	4.1	4.4	64 KB inst. per module 16 KB data per core	2×2 MB	HD 8670D	384:24:8; 6 CU	844	648.1	2133	100	AD680KWOHLBOX	AD680KWOA44HL
A10-6800B	Jun 4, 2013	32 nm	RL-A1	[2]4	4.1	4.4	64 KB inst. per module 16 KB data per core	2×2 MB	HD 8670D	384:24:8; 6 CU	844	648.1	2133	100		AD680BWOA44HL

==== "Kabini" (2013, SoC) ====
- Fabrication 28 nm by GlobalFoundries
- Socket AM1, aka Socket FS1b (AM1 platform)
- 2 to 4 CPU Cores (Jaguar (microarchitecture))
- L1 Cache: 32 KB Data per core and 32 KB Instructions per core
- MMX, SSE, SSE2, SSE3, SSSE3, SSE4a, SSE4.1, SSE4.2, AMD64, AVX, F16C, CLMUL, AES, MOVBE (Move Big-Endian instruction), XSAVE/XSAVEOPT, ABM, BMI1, AMD-V support
- SoC with integrated memory, PCIe, 2× USB 3.0, 6× USB 2.0, Gigabit Ethernet, and 2× SATA III (6 Gb/s) controllers
- GPU based on Graphics Core Next (GCN)

Model	Released	Fab	Step.	CPU					GPU				DDR3 memory support	TDP (W)	Box number	Part number
Model	Released	Fab	Step.	Cores (threads)	Clock rate (GHz)		Cache (Note: AMD in its technical documentation uses KB, which it defines as Kilobyte and as equal to 1024 bytes, and MB, which it defines as Megabyte and as equal to 1024 KB.)		Model	Config	Clock (MHz)	Processing power (GFLOPS) (Note: Single-precision performance is calculated from the base (or boost) core clock speed based on a FMA operation.)	DDR3 memory support	TDP (W)	Box number	Part number
Model	Released	Fab	Step.	Cores (threads)	Base	Boost	L1	L2	Model	Config	Clock (MHz)	Processing power (GFLOPS)	DDR3 memory support	TDP (W)	Box number	Part number
Athlon X4 530		28 nm	KB-A1	4 (4)	2.00	—N/a	32 KB inst. 32 KB data per core	2 MB	—N/a				1600 single-channel	25		AD530XJAH44HM
Athlon X4 550		28 nm	KB-A1	4 (4)	2.20	—N/a	32 KB inst. 32 KB data per core	2 MB	—N/a				1600 single-channel	25		AD550XJAH44HM
Sempron 2650	Apr 9, 2014	28 nm	KB-A1	2 (2)	1.45	—N/a	32 KB inst. 32 KB data per core	1 MB	R3 (HD 8240)	128:8:4; 2 CU	400	102.4	1333 single-channel	25	SD2650JAHMBOX	SD2650JAH23HM
Sempron 3850	Apr 9, 2014	28 nm	KB-A1	4 (4)	1.30	—N/a	32 KB inst. 32 KB data per core	2 MB	R3 (HD 8280)	128:8:4; 2 CU	450	115.2	1600 single-channel	25	SD3850JAHMBOX	SD3850JAH44HM
Athlon 5150	Apr 9, 2014	28 nm	KB-A1	4 (4)	1.60	—N/a	32 KB inst. 32 KB data per core	2 MB	R3 (HD 8400)	128:8:4; 2 CU	600	153.6	1600 single-channel	25	AD5150JAHMBOX	AD5150JAH44HM
Athlon 5350	Apr 9, 2014	28 nm	KB-A1	4 (4)	2.05	—N/a	32 KB inst. 32 KB data per core	2 MB	R3 (HD 8400)	128:8:4; 2 CU	600	153.6	1600 single-channel	25	AD5350JAHMBOX	AD5350JAH44HM
Athlon 5370	Feb 2016	28 nm	KB-A1	4 (4)	2.20	—N/a	32 KB inst. 32 KB data per core	2 MB	R3 (HD 8400)	128:8:4; 2 CU	600	153.6	1600 single-channel	25		AD5370JAH44HM

==== "Kaveri" (2014) & "Godavari" (2015) ====
- Fabrication 28 nm by GlobalFoundries.
- Socket FM2+, support for PCIe 3.0.
- Two or four CPU cores based on the Steamroller microarchitecture.
  - Kaveri refresh models have codename Godavari.
- Die Size: 245 mm^{2}, 2.41 Billion transistors.
- L1 Cache: 16 KB Data per core and 96 KB Instructions per module.
- MMX, SSE, SSE2, SSE3, SSSE3, SSE4.1, SSE4.2, SSE4a, AMD64, AMD-V, AES, CLMUL, AVX, XOP, FMA3, FMA4, F16C, ABM, BMI1, TBM, Turbo Core
- Three to eight Compute Units (CUs) based on GCN 2nd gen microarchitecture; 1 Compute Unit (CU) consists of 64 Unified Shader Processors : 4 Texture Mapping Units (TMUs) : 1 Render Output Unit (ROPs).
- Heterogeneous System Architecture-enabled zero-copy through pointer passing.
- SIP blocks: Unified Video Decoder, Video Coding Engine, TrueAudio.
- Dual-channel (2× 64 Bit) DDR3 memory controller.
- Integrated custom ARM Cortex-A5 co-processor with TrustZone Security Extensions in select APU models, except the Performance APU models.
- Select models support Hybrid Graphics technology by using a Radeon R7 240 or R7 250 discrete graphics card.
- Display controller: AMD Eyefinity 2, 4K Ultra HD support, DisplayPort 1.2 Support.

Model	Released	Fab	Step.	CPU					GPU				DDR3 memory support	TDP (W)	Box number	Part number
Model	Released	Fab	Step.	[Modules/FPUs] Cores/threads	Clock rate (GHz)		Cache (Note: AMD in its technical documentation uses KB, which it defines as Kilobyte and as equal to 1024 bytes, and MB, which it defines as Megabyte and as equal to 1024 KB.)		Model	Config	Clock (MHz)	Processing power (GFLOPS) (Note: Single-precision performance is calculated from the base (or boost) core clock speed based on a FMA operation.)	DDR3 memory support	TDP (W)	Box number	Part number
Model	Released	Fab	Step.	[Modules/FPUs] Cores/threads	Base	Boost	L1	L2	Model	Config	Clock (MHz)	Processing power (GFLOPS)	DDR3 memory support	TDP (W)	Box number	Part number
Athlon X2 450	Jul 31, 2014	28 nm	KV-A1	[1]2	3.5	3.9	96 KB inst. per module 16 KB data per core	1 MB	—N/a				1866	65		AD450XYBI23JA
Athlon X4 830	2018	28 nm	KV-A1	[2]4	3.0	3.4	96 KB inst. per module 16 KB data per core	2×2 MB	—N/a				2133	65		AD830XYBI44JA
Athlon X4 840	Aug 2014	28 nm	KV-A1	[2]4	3.1	3.8	96 KB inst. per module 16 KB data per core	2×2 MB	—N/a				2133	65	AD840XYBJABOX	AD840XYBI44JA
Athlon X4 850	2015	28 nm	GV-A1	[2]4	3.2		96 KB inst. per module 16 KB data per core	2×2 MB	—N/a				2133	65		AD835XACI43KA
Athlon X4 860K	Aug 2014	28 nm	KV-A1	[2]4	3.7	4.0	96 KB inst. per module 16 KB data per core	2×2 MB	—N/a				2133	95	AD860KXBJABOX; AD860KWOHLBOX; AD860KXBJASBX	AD860KXBI44JA
Athlon X4 870K	Dec 2015	28 nm	GV-A1	[2]4	3.9	4.1	96 KB inst. per module 16 KB data per core	2×2 MB	—N/a				2133	95	AD870KXBJCSBX	AD870KXBI44JC
Athlon X4 880K	Mar 1, 2016	28 nm	GV-A1	[2]4	4.0	4.2	96 KB inst. per module 16 KB data per core	2×2 MB	—N/a				2133	95	AD880KXBJCSBX	
FX-770K	Dec 2014	28 nm	KV-A1	[2]4	3.5	3.9	96 KB inst. per module 16 KB data per core	2×2 MB	—N/a				2133	65		FD770KYBI44JA
A4 Pro-7350B	Jul 31, 2014	28 nm	KV-A1	[1]2	3.4	3.8	96 KB inst. per module 16 KB data per core	1 MB	R5	192:12:8; 3 CU	514	197.3	1866	65		AD735BYBI23JA
Pro A4-8350B	Sep 29, 2015	28 nm	KV-A1	[1]2	3.5	3.9	96 KB inst. per module 16 KB data per core	1 MB	R5	256:16:8; 4 CU	757	387.5	1866	65		AD835BYBI23JC
A6-7400K	Jul 31, 2014	28 nm	KV-A1	[1]2	3.5	3.9	96 KB inst. per module 16 KB data per core	1 MB	R5	256:16:8; 4 CU	756	387	1866	65	AD740KYBJABOX	AD740KYBI23JA
A6 Pro-7400B	Jul 31, 2014	28 nm	KV-A1	[1]2	3.5	3.9	96 KB inst. per module 16 KB data per core	1 MB	R5	256:16:8; 4 CU	756	387	1866	65		AD740BYBI23JA
A6-7470K	Feb 2, 2016	28 nm	GV-A1	[1]2	3.7	4.0	96 KB inst. per module 16 KB data per core	1 MB	R5	256:16:8; 4 CU	800	409.6	2133	65	AD747KYBJCBOX	AD747KYBI23JC
Pro A6-8550B	Sep 29, 2015	28 nm	GV-A1	[1]2	3.7	4.0	96 KB inst. per module 16 KB data per core	1 MB	R5	256:16:8; 4 CU	800	409.6	2133	65		AD855BYBI23JC
A8-7500	2014	28 nm	KV-A1	[2]4	3.0	3.7	96 KB inst. per module 16 KB data per core	2×2 MB	R7	384:24:8; 6 CU	720	552.9	2133	65		AD7500YBI44JA
A8-7600	Jul 31, 2014	28 nm	KV-A1	[2]4	3.1	3.8	96 KB inst. per module 16 KB data per core	2×2 MB	R7	384:24:8; 6 CU	720	552.9	2133	65	AD7600YBJABOX	AD7600YBI44JA
A8 Pro-7600B	Jul 31, 2014	28 nm	KV-A1	[2]4	3.1	3.8	96 KB inst. per module 16 KB data per core	2×2 MB	R7	384:24:8; 6 CU	720	552.9	2133	65		AD760BYBI44JA
A8-7650K	Jan 7, 2015	28 nm	KV-A1	[2]4	3.3	3.8	96 KB inst. per module 16 KB data per core	2×2 MB	R7	384:24:8; 6 CU	720	552.9	2133	95	AD765KXBJABOX; AD765KXBJASBX	AD765KXBI44JA
A8-7670K	Jul 20, 2015	28 nm	GV-A1	[2]4	3.6	3.9	96 KB inst. per module 16 KB data per core	2×2 MB	R7	384:24:8; 6 CU	757	581.3	2133	95	AD767KXBJCSBX; AD767KXBJCBOX	AD767KXBI44JC
Pro A8-8650B	Sep 29, 2015	28 nm	GV-A1	[2]4	3.2	3.9	96 KB inst. per module 16 KB data per core	2×2 MB	R7	384:24:8; 6 CU	757	581.3	2133	65		AD865BYBI44JC
A10-7700K	Jan 14, 2014	28 nm	KV-A1	[2]4	3.4	3.8	96 KB inst. per module 16 KB data per core	2×2 MB	R7	384:24:8; 6 CU	720	552.9	2133	95	AD770KXBJABOX	AD770KXBI44JA
A10-7800	Jul 31, 2014	28 nm	KV-A1	[2]4	3.5	3.9	96 KB inst. per module 16 KB data per core	2×2 MB	R7	512:32:8; 8 CU	720	737.2	2133	65	AD7800YBJABOX	AD7800YBI44JA
A10 Pro-7800B	Jul 31, 2014	28 nm	KV-A1	[2]4	3.5	3.9	96 KB inst. per module 16 KB data per core	2×2 MB	R7	512:32:8; 8 CU	720	737.2	2133	65		AD780BYBI44JA
A10-7850K	Jan 14, 2014	28 nm	KV-A1	[2]4	3.7	4.0	96 KB inst. per module 16 KB data per core	2×2 MB	R7	512:32:8; 8 CU	720	737.2	2133	95	AD785KXBJABOX	AD785KXBI44JA
A10 Pro-7850B	Jul 31, 2014	28 nm	KV-A1	[2]4	3.7	4.0	96 KB inst. per module 16 KB data per core	2×2 MB	R7	512:32:8; 8 CU	720	737.2	2133	95		AD785BXBI44JA
A10-7860K	Feb 2, 2016	28 nm	GV-A1	[2]4	3.6	4.0	96 KB inst. per module 16 KB data per core	2×2 MB	R7	512:32:8; 8 CU	757	775.1	2133	65	AD786KYBJABOX; AD786KYBJCSBX	AD786KYBI44JC
A10-7870K	May 28, 2015	28 nm	GV-A1	[2]4	3.9	4.1	96 KB inst. per module 16 KB data per core	2×2 MB	R7	512:32:8; 8 CU	866	886.7	2133	95	AD787KXDJCBOX; AD787KXDJCSBX	AD787KXDI44JC
A10-7890K	Mar 1, 2016	28 nm	GV-A1	[2]4	4.1	4.3	96 KB inst. per module 16 KB data per core	2×2 MB	R7	512:32:8; 8 CU	866	886.7	2133	95	AD789KXDJCHBX	AD789KXDI44JC
Pro A10-8750B	Sep 29, 2015	28 nm	GV-A1	[2]4	3.6	4.0	96 KB inst. per module 16 KB data per core	2×2 MB	R7	512:32:8; 8 CU	757	775.1	2133	65		AD875BYBI44JC
Pro A10-8850B	Sep 29, 2015	28 nm	GV-A1	[2]4	3.9	4.1	96 KB inst. per module 16 KB data per core	2×2 MB	R7	512:32:8; 8 CU	800	819.2	2133	95		AD885BXBI44JC
Model	Released	Fab	Step.	[Modules/FPUs] Cores/threads	Base	Boost	L1	L2	Model	Config	Clock (MHz)	Processing power (GFLOPS)	DDR3 memory support	TDP (W)	Box number	Part number
Model	Released	Fab	Step.	[Modules/FPUs] Cores/threads	Clock rate (GHz)		Cache		Model	Config	Clock (MHz)	Processing power (GFLOPS)	DDR3 memory support	TDP (W)	Box number	Part number
Model	Released	Fab	Step.	CPU					GPU				DDR3 memory support	TDP (W)	Box number	Part number

==== "Carrizo" (2016) ====
- Fabrication: 28 nm by GlobalFoundries
- Socket FM2+ or AM4, support for PCIe 3.0
- Two or four CPU cores based on the Excavator microarchitecture
- Die size: 250.04 mm^{2}, 3.1 billion transistors
- L1 cache: 32 KB data per core and 96 KB instructions per module
- MMX, SSE, SSE2, SSE3, SSSE3, SSE4.1, SSE4.2, SSE4a, AMD64, AMD-V, AES, CLMUL, AVX, AVX2, XOP, FMA3, FMA4, F16C, ABM, BMI1, BMI2, TBM, RDRAND, Turbo Core
- Single- or dual-channel DDR3 or DDR4 memory controller
- Third generation GCN-based GPU (Radeon M300)
- Integrated custom ARM Cortex-A5 coprocessor with TrustZone security extensions

Model	Released	Fab	Step.	Socket	CPU					GPU				Memory support	TDP (W)	Box number (Note: With cooler if available.)	Part number
Model	Released	Fab	Step.	Socket	[Modules/FPUs] Cores/threads	Clock rate (GHz)		Cache (Note: AMD in its technical documentation uses KB, which it defines as Kilobyte and as equal to 1024 bytes, and MB, which it defines as Megabyte and as equal to 1024 KB.)		Model	Config	Clock (MHz)	Processing power (GFLOPS) (Note: Single-precision performance is calculated from the base (or boost) core clock speed based on a FMA operation.)	Memory support	TDP (W)	Box number	Part number
Model	Released	Fab	Step.	Socket	[Modules/FPUs] Cores/threads	Base	Boost	L1	L2	Model	Config	Clock (MHz)	Processing power (GFLOPS)	Memory support	TDP (W)	Box number	Part number
Athlon X4 835		28 nm	CZ-A1	FM2+	[2]4	3.1		96 KB inst. per module 32 KB data per core	2×1 MB	—N/a				DDR3-2133	65		AD835XACI43KA
Athlon X4 845	Feb 2, 2016	28 nm	CZ-A1	FM2+	[2]4	3.5	3.8	96 KB inst. per module 32 KB data per core	2×1 MB	—N/a				DDR3-2133	65	AD845XYBJCSBX; AD845XACKASBX	AD845XACI43KA
A6-7480	Oct 2018	28 nm	CZ-A1	FM2+	[1]2	3.5	3.8	96 KB inst. per module 32 KB data per core	1 MB	R5	384:24:8; 6 CU	900	691.2	DDR3-2133	65	AD7480ACABBOX	AD7480ACI23AB
A8-7680	Oct 2018	28 nm	CZ-A1	FM2+	[2]4	3.5	3.8	96 KB inst. per module 32 KB data per core	2×1 MB	R7	384:24:8; 6 CU	900	691.2	DDR3-2133	65	AD7680ACABBOX	AD7680ACI43AB
Pro A6-8570E	Oct 2016	28 nm	CZ-A1	AM4	[1]2	3.0	3.4	96 KB inst. per module 32 KB data per core	1 MB	R5	256:16:4; 4 CU	800	409.6	DDR4-2400	35		AD857BAHM23AB
Pro A6-8570	Oct 2016	28 nm	CZ-A1	AM4	[1]2	3.5	3.8	96 KB inst. per module 32 KB data per core	1 MB	R5	384:24:6; 6 CU	1029	790.2	DDR4-2400	65		AD857BAGM23AB
Pro A10-8770E	Oct 2016	28 nm	CZ-A1	AM4	[2]4	2.8	3.5	96 KB inst. per module 32 KB data per core	2×1 MB	R7	384:24:6; 6 CU	847	650.4	DDR4-2400	35		AD877BAHM44AB
Pro A10-8770	Oct 2016	28 nm	CZ-A1	AM4	[2]4	3.5	3.8	96 KB inst. per module 32 KB data per core	2×1 MB	R7	384:24:6; 6 CU	1029	790.2	DDR4-2400	65		AD877BAGM44AB
Pro A12-8870E	Oct 2016	28 nm	CZ-A1	AM4	[2]4	2.9	3.8	96 KB inst. per module 32 KB data per core	2×1 MB	R7	512:32:8; 8 CU	900	921.6	DDR4-2400	35		AD887BAHM44AB
Pro A12-8870	Oct 2016	28 nm	CZ-A1	AM4	[2]4	3.7	4.2	96 KB inst. per module 32 KB data per core	2×1 MB	R7	512:32:8; 8 CU	1108	1134.5	DDR4-2400	65		AD887BAUM44AB

==== "Bristol Ridge" (2016) ====
- Fabrication 28 nm by GlobalFoundries
- Socket AM4, support for PCIe 3.0
- Two or four "Excavator+" CPU cores
- L1 Cache: 32 KB Data per core and 96 KB Instructions per module
- MMX, SSE, SSE2, SSE3, SSSE3, SSE4.1, SSE4.2, SSE4a, AMD64, AMD-V, AES, CLMUL, AVX, AVX2, XOP, FMA3, FMA4, F16C, ABM, BMI1, BMI2, TBM, RDRAND, Turbo Core
- Dual-channel DDR4 memory controller
- PCI Express 3.0 x8 (No Bifurcation support, requires a PCI-e switch for any configuration other than x8)
- PCI Express 3.0 x4 as link to optional external chipset
- 4x USB 3.1 Gen 1
- Storage: 2x SATA and 2x NVMe or 2x PCI Express
- Third Generation GCN based GPU with hybrid VP9 decoding

Model	Released	Fab	Step.	CPU					GPU				DDR4 memory support	TDP (W)	Box number (Note: With cooler if available.)	Part number
Model	Released	Fab	Step.	[Modules/FPUs] Cores/threads	Clock rate (GHz)		Cache (Note: AMD in its technical documentation uses KB, which it defines as Kilobyte and as equal to 1024 bytes, and MB, which it defines as Megabyte and as equal to 1024 KB.)		Model	Config	Clock (MHz)	Processing power (GFLOPS) (Note: Single-precision performance is calculated from the base (or boost) core clock speed based on a FMA operation.)	DDR4 memory support	TDP (W)	Box number	Part number
Model	Released	Fab	Step.	[Modules/FPUs] Cores/threads	Base	Boost	L1	L2	Model	Config	Clock (MHz)	Processing power (GFLOPS)	DDR4 memory support	TDP (W)	Box number	Part number
Athlon X4 940	Jul 27, 2017	28 nm	BR-A1	[2]4	3.2	3.6	96 KB inst. per module 32 KB data per core	2×1 MB	—N/a				2400	65	AD940XAGABBOX	AD940XAGM44AB
Athlon X4 950	Jul 27, 2017	28 nm	BR-A1	[2]4	3.5	3.8	96 KB inst. per module 32 KB data per core	2×1 MB	—N/a				2400	65	AD950XAGABBOX	AD950XAGM44AB
Athlon X4 970	Jul 27, 2017	28 nm	BR-A1	[2]4	3.8	4.0	96 KB inst. per module 32 KB data per core	2×1 MB	—N/a				2400	65	AD970XAUABBOX	AD970XAUM44AB
A6-9400	Mar 16, 2019	28 nm	BR-A1	[1]2	3.4	3.7	96 KB inst. per module 32 KB data per core	1 MB	R5	192:12:4; 3 CU	720	276.4	2400	65	AD9400AGABBOX	AD9400AGM23AB
A6-9500E	Sep 5, 2016	28 nm	BR-A1	[1]2	3.0	3.4	96 KB inst. per module 32 KB data per core	1 MB	R5	256:16:4; 4 CU	800	409.6	2400	35	AD9500AHABBOX	AD9500AHM23AB
Pro A6-9500E	Oct 3, 2016	28 nm	BR-A1	[1]2	3.0	3.4	96 KB inst. per module 32 KB data per core	1 MB	R5	256:16:4; 4 CU	800	409.6	2400	35		AD950BAHM23AB
A6-9500	Sep 5, 2016	28 nm	BR-A1	[1]2	3.5	3.8	96 KB inst. per module 32 KB data per core	1 MB	R5	384:24:6; 6 CU	1029	790.2	2400	65	AD9500AGABBOX	AD9500AGM23AB
Pro A6-9500	Oct 3, 2016	28 nm	BR-A1	[1]2	3.5	3.8	96 KB inst. per module 32 KB data per core	1 MB	R5	384:24:6; 6 CU	1029	790.2	2400	65		AD950BAGM23AB
A6-9550	Jul 27, 2017	28 nm	BR-A1	[1]2	3.8	4.0	96 KB inst. per module 32 KB data per core	1 MB	R5	256:16:4; 4 CU	800	409.6	2400	65	AD9550AGABBOX	AD9550AGM23AB
A8-9600	Sep 5, 2016	28 nm	BR-A1	[2]4	3.1	3.4	96 KB inst. per module 32 KB data per core	2×1 MB	R7	384:24:6; 6 CU	900	691.2	2400	65	AD9600AGABBOX	AD9600AGM44AB
Pro A8-9600	Oct 3, 2016	28 nm	BR-A1	[2]4	3.1	3.4	96 KB inst. per module 32 KB data per core	2×1 MB	R7	384:24:6; 6 CU	900	691.2	2400	65		AD960BAGM44AB
A10-9700E	Sep 5, 2016	28 nm	BR-A1	[2]4	3.0	3.5	96 KB inst. per module 32 KB data per core	2×1 MB	R7	384:24:6; 6 CU	847	650.4	2400	35	AD9700AHABBOX	AD9700AHM44AB
Pro A10-9700E	Oct 3, 2016	28 nm	BR-A1	[2]4	3.0	3.5	96 KB inst. per module 32 KB data per core	2×1 MB	R7	384:24:6; 6 CU	847	650.4	2400	35		AD970BAHM44AB
A10-9700	Sep 5, 2016	28 nm	BR-A1	[2]4	3.5	3.8	96 KB inst. per module 32 KB data per core	2×1 MB	R7	384:24:6; 6 CU	1029	790.2	2400	65	AD9700AGABBOX	AD9700AGM44AB
Pro A10-9700	Oct 3, 2016	28 nm	BR-A1	[2]4	3.5	3.8	96 KB inst. per module 32 KB data per core	2×1 MB	R7	384:24:6; 6 CU	1029	790.2	2400	65		AD970BAGM44AB
A12-9800E	Sep 5, 2016	28 nm	BR-A1	[2]4	3.1	3.8	96 KB inst. per module 32 KB data per core	2×1 MB	R7	512:32:8; 8 CU	900	921.6	2400	35	AD9800AHABBOX	AD9800AUM44AB
Pro A12-9800E	Oct 3, 2016	28 nm	BR-A1	[2]4	3.1	3.8	96 KB inst. per module 32 KB data per core	2×1 MB	R7	512:32:8; 8 CU	900	921.6	2400	35		AD980BAHM44AB
A12-9800	Sep 5, 2016	28 nm	BR-A1	[2]4	3.8	4.2	96 KB inst. per module 32 KB data per core	2×1 MB	R7	512:32:8; 8 CU	1108	1134.5	2400	65	AD9800AUABBOX	AD9800AUM44AB
Pro A12-9800	Oct 3, 2016	28 nm	BR-A1	[2]4	3.8	4.2	96 KB inst. per module 32 KB data per core	2×1 MB	R7	512:32:8; 8 CU	1108	1134.5	2400	65		AD980BAUM44AB

==== "Raven Ridge" (2018) ====
- Fabrication 14 nm by GlobalFoundries
- Transistors: 4.94 billion
- Die size: 210 mm^{2}
- Socket AM4
- Zen CPU cores
- MMX, SSE, SSE2, SSE3, SSSE3, SSE4.1, SSE4.2, SSE4a, AMD64, AMD-V, AES, CLMUL, AVX, AVX2, FMA3, F16C, ABM, BMI1, BMI2, RDRAND, Turbo Core
- Dual-channel DDR4 memory controller
- Fifth generation GCN based GPU
- Video Core Next (VCN) 1.0

Common features of Zen based Raven Ridge desktop APUs:

- Socket: AM4.
- All the CPUs support DDR4-2666 (DDR4-2933 Ryzen) in dual-channel mode.
- L1 cache: 96 KB (32 KB data + 64 KB instruction) per core.
- L2 cache: 512 KB per core.
- All the CPUs support 16 PCIe 3.0 lanes.
- Includes integrated GCN 5th generation GPU.
- Fabrication process: GlobalFoundries 14LP.

Model	CPU				GPU				TDP	Release date	Release price
Model	Cores (threads)	Clock rate (GHz)		L3 cache (total)	Model	Config (Note: Unified shaders : Texture mapping units : Render output units and Compute units (CU))	Clock (MHz)	Processing power (GFLOPS) (Note: Single-precision performance is calculated from the base (or boost) core clock speed based on a FMA operation.)	TDP	Release date	Release price
Model	Cores (threads)	Base	Boost	L3 cache (total)	Model	Config	Clock (MHz)	Processing power (GFLOPS)	TDP	Release date	Release price
Athlon 200GE	2 (4)	3.2	—N/a	4 MB	Vega 3	192:12:4; 3 CU	1000	384	35 W	Sep 6, 2018	US $55
Athlon Pro 200GE	2 (4)	3.2	—N/a	4 MB	Vega 3	192:12:4; 3 CU	1000	384	35 W	Sep 6, 2018	OEM
Athlon 220GE	2 (4)	3.4	—N/a	4 MB	Vega 3	192:12:4; 3 CU	1000	384	35 W	Dec 21, 2018	US $65
Athlon 240GE	2 (4)	3.5	—N/a	4 MB	Vega 3	192:12:4; 3 CU	1000	384	35 W	Dec 21, 2018	US $75
Athlon 300GE	2 (4)	3.4	—N/a	4 MB	Vega 3	192:12:4; 3 CU	1100	424.4	35 W	Jul 7, 2019	OEM
Athlon Pro 300GE	2 (4)	3.4	—N/a	4 MB	Vega 3	192:12:4; 3 CU	1100	424.4	35 W	Sep 30, 2019	OEM
Athlon 320GE	2 (4)	3.5	—N/a	4 MB	Vega 3	192:12:4; 3 CU	1100	424.4	35 W	Jul 7, 2019	OEM
Athlon 3000G	2 (4)	3.5	—N/a	4 MB	Vega 3	192:12:4; 3 CU	1100	424.4	35 W	Nov 19, 2019	US $49
Athlon Silver 3050GE	2 (4)	3.4	—N/a	4 MB	Vega 3	192:12:4; 3 CU	1100	424.4	35 W	Jul 21, 2020	OEM
Ryzen 3 Pro 2100GE	2 (4)	3.2	—N/a	4 MB	Vega 3	192:12:4; 3 CU	1000	384	35 W	2019	OEM
Ryzen 3 2200GE	4 (4)	3.2	3.6	4 MB	Vega 8	512:32:16; 8 CU	1100	1126	35 W	Apr 19, 2018	OEM
Ryzen 3 Pro 2200GE	4 (4)	3.2	3.6	4 MB	Vega 8	512:32:16; 8 CU	1100	1126	35 W	May 10, 2018	OEM
Ryzen 3 2200G	4 (4)	3.5	3.7	4 MB	Vega 8	512:32:16; 8 CU	1100	1126	65 W	Feb 12, 2018	US $99
Ryzen 3 Pro 2200G	4 (4)	3.5	3.7	4 MB	Vega 8	512:32:16; 8 CU	1100	1126	65 W	May 10, 2018	OEM
Ryzen 5 2400GE	4 (8)	3.2	3.8	4 MB	RX Vega 11	704:44:16; 11 CU	1250	1760	35 W	Apr 19, 2018	OEM
Ryzen 5 Pro 2400GE	4 (8)	3.2	3.8	4 MB	Vega 11	704:44:16; 11 CU	1250	1760	35 W	May 10, 2018	OEM
Ryzen 5 2400G	4 (8)	3.6	3.9	4 MB	RX Vega 11	704:44:16; 11 CU	1250	1760	65 W	Feb 12, 2018	US $169
Ryzen 5 Pro 2400G	4 (8)	3.6	3.9	4 MB	Vega 11	704:44:16; 11 CU	1250	1760	65 W	May 10, 2018	OEM

==== "Picasso" (2019) ====
- Fabrication 12 nm by GlobalFoundries
- Transistors: 4.94 billion
- Die size: 210 mm^{2}
- Socket AM4
- Zen+ CPU cores
- MMX, SSE, SSE2, SSE3, SSSE3, SSE4.1, SSE4.2, SSE4a, AMD64, AMD-V, AES, CLMUL, AVX, AVX2, FMA3, F16C, ABM, BMI1, BMI2, RDRAND, Turbo Core
- Dual-channel DDR4 memory controller
- Fifth generation GCN based GPU
- Video Core Next (VCN) 1.0

Common features of Zen+ based desktop APUs:

- Socket: AM4.
- All the CPUs support DDR4-2933 in dual-channel mode, while Athlon Pro 300GE and Athlon Silver Pro 3125GE support only DDR4-2666.
- L1 cache: 96 KB (32 KB data + 64 KB instruction) per core.
- L2 cache: 512 KB per core.
- All the CPUs support 16 PCIe 3.0 lanes.
- Includes integrated GCN 5th generation GPU.
- Fabrication process: GlobalFoundries 12LP.

Model	CPU				GPU				TDP	Release date	Release price
Model	Cores (threads)	Clock rate (GHz)		L3 cache (total)	Model (Note: Starting with 2020 releases, AMD stopped referring to integrated graphics as "Vega", therefore all Vega based iGPUs are branded as AMD Radeon Graphics (instead Radeon Vega 3 or Radeon Vega 10).)	Config (Note: Unified shaders : Texture mapping units : Render output units and Compute units (CU))	Clock (MHz)	Processing power (GFLOPS) (Note: Single-precision performance is calculated from the base (or boost) core clock speed based on a FMA operation.)	TDP	Release date	Release price
Model	Cores (threads)	Base	Boost	L3 cache (total)	Model	Config	Clock (MHz)	Processing power (GFLOPS)	TDP	Release date	Release price
Athlon Pro 300GE	2 (4)	3.4	—N/a	4 MB	Vega 3	192:12:4; 3 CU	1100	424.4	35 W	Sep 30, 2019	OEM
Athlon Silver Pro 3125GE	2 (4)	3.4	—N/a	4 MB	Radeon; Graphics	192:12:4; 3 CU	1100	424.4	35 W	Jul 21, 2020	OEM
Athlon Gold 3150GE	4 (4)	3.3	3.8	4 MB	Radeon; Graphics	192:12:4; 3 CU	1100	424.4	35 W	Jul 21, 2020	OEM
Athlon Gold Pro 3150GE	4 (4)	3.3	3.8	4 MB	Radeon; Graphics	192:12:4; 3 CU	1100	424.4	35 W	Jul 21, 2020	OEM
Athlon Gold 3150G	4 (4)	3.5	3.9	4 MB	Radeon; Graphics	192:12:4; 3 CU	1100	424.4	65 W	Jul 21, 2020	OEM
Athlon Gold Pro 3150G	4 (4)	3.5	3.9	4 MB	Radeon; Graphics	192:12:4; 3 CU	1100	424.4	65 W	Jul 21, 2020	OEM
Ryzen 3 3200GE	4 (4)	3.3	3.8	4 MB	Vega 8	512:32:16; 8 CU	1200	1228.8	35 W	Jul 7, 2019	OEM
Ryzen 3 Pro 3200GE	4 (4)	3.3	3.8	4 MB	Vega 8	512:32:16; 8 CU	1200	1228.8	35 W	Sep 30, 2019	OEM
Ryzen 3 3200G	4 (4)	3.6	4.0	4 MB	Vega 8	512:32:16; 8 CU	1250	1280	65 W	Jul 7, 2019	US $99
Ryzen 3 Pro 3200G	4 (4)	3.6	4.0	4 MB	Vega 8	512:32:16; 8 CU	1250	1280	65 W	Sep 30, 2019	OEM
Ryzen 5 Pro 3350GE	4 (4)	3.3	3.9	4 MB	Radeon; Graphics	640:40:16; 10 CU	1200	1536	35 W	Jul 21, 2020	OEM
Ryzen 5 Pro 3350G	4 (8)	3.6	4.0	4 MB	Radeon; Graphics	640:40:16; 10 CU	1300	1830.4	65 W	Jul 21, 2020	OEM
Ryzen 5 3400GE	4 (8)	3.3	4.0	4 MB	Vega 11	704:44:16; 11 CU	1300	1830.4	35 W	Jul 7, 2019	OEM
Ryzen 5 Pro 3400GE	4 (8)	3.3	4.0	4 MB	Vega 11	704:44:16; 11 CU	1300	1830.4	35 W	Sep 30, 2019	OEM
Ryzen 5 3400G	4 (8)	3.7	4.2	4 MB	RX Vega 11	704:44:16; 11 CU	1400	1971.2	65 W	Jul 7, 2019	US $149
Ryzen 5 Pro 3400G	4 (8)	3.7	4.2	4 MB	Vega 11	704:44:16; 11 CU	1400	1971.2	65 W	Sep 30, 2019	OEM

==== "Renoir" (2020) ====
- Fabrication 7 nm by TSMC
- Socket AM4
- Up to eight Zen 2 CPU cores
- Dual-channel DDR4 memory controller

Common features of Ryzen 4000 desktop APUs:

- Socket: AM4.
- All the CPUs support DDR4-3200 in dual-channel mode.
- L1 cache: 64 KB (32 KB data + 32 KB instruction) per core.
- L2 cache: 512 KB per core.
- All the CPUs support 24 PCIe 3.0 lanes. 4 of the lanes are reserved as link to the chipset.
- Includes integrated GCN 5th generation GPU.
- Fabrication process: TSMC 7FF.

Branding and model		CPU					GPU				TDP	Release date	Release price
Branding and model		Cores (threads)	Clock rate (GHz)		L3 cache (total)	Core Config (Note: Core complexes (CCXs) × cores per CCX)	Model	Clock (GHz)	Config (Note: Unified shaders : Texture mapping units : Render output units and Compute units (CU))	Processing power (Note: Single-precision performance is calculated from the base (or boost) core clock speed based on a FMA operation.) (GFLOPS)	TDP	Release date	Release price
Branding and model		Cores (threads)	Base	Boost	L3 cache (total)	Core Config	Model	Clock (GHz)	Config	Processing power (GFLOPS)	TDP	Release date	Release price
Ryzen 7	4700G (Note: Model also available as PRO version as 4350GE, 4350G, 4650GE, 4650G, 4750GE, 4750G, released on July 21, 2020 for OEM only. Refresh models 4355GE, 4355G, 4655GE, 4655G released November 11, 2022.)	8 (16)	3.6	4.4	8 MB	2 × 4	Radeon; Graphics (Note: All of the iGPUs are branded as AMD Radeon Graphics.)	2.1	512:32:16; 8 CU	2150.4	65 W	Jul 21, 2020	OEM
Ryzen 7	4700GE	8 (16)	3.1	4.3	8 MB	2 × 4	Radeon; Graphics	2.0	512:32:16; 8 CU	2048	35 W	Jul 21, 2020	OEM
Ryzen 5	4600G	6 (12)	3.7	4.2	8 MB	2 × 3	Radeon; Graphics	1.9	448:28:14; 7 CU	1702.4	65 W	Jul 21, 2020 (OEM); Apr 4, 2022 (retail)	US $154
Ryzen 5	4600GE	6 (12)	3.3	4.2	8 MB	2 × 3	Radeon; Graphics	1.9	448:28:14; 7 CU	1702.4	35 W	Jul 21, 2020	OEM
Ryzen 3	4300G	4 (8)	3.8	4.0	4 MB	1 × 4	Radeon; Graphics	1.7	384:24:12; 6 CU	1305.6	65 W	Jul 21, 2020	OEM
Ryzen 3	4300GE	4 (8)	3.5	4.0	4 MB	1 × 4	Radeon; Graphics	1.7	384:24:12; 6 CU	1305.6	35 W	Jul 21, 2020	OEM

==== "Cezanne" (2021) ====
- Fabrication 7 nm by TSMC
- Socket AM4
- Up to eight Zen 3 CPU cores
- Dual-channel DDR4 memory controller

Common features of Ryzen 5000 desktop APUs:

- Socket: AM4.
- All the CPUs support DDR4-3200 in dual-channel mode.
- L1 cache: 64 KB (32 KB data + 32 KB instruction) per core.
- L2 cache: 512 KB per core.
- All the CPUs support 24 PCIe 3.0 lanes. 4 of the lanes are reserved as link to the chipset.
- Includes integrated GCN 5th generation GPU.
- Fabrication process: TSMC 7FF.

Branding and model		CPU					GPU (Note: All of the iGPUs are branded as AMD Radeon Graphics.)			Thermal solution	TDP	Release date	MSRP
Branding and model		Cores (threads)	Clock rate (GHz)		L3 cache (total)	Core config (Note: Core Complexes (CCX) × cores per CCX)	Clock (MHz)	Config (Note: Unified shaders : texture mapping units : render output units and compute units (CU))	Processing power (Note: Single precision performance is calculated from the base (or boost) core clock speed based on a FMA operation.) (GFLOPS)	Thermal solution	TDP	Release date	MSRP
Branding and model		Cores (threads)	Base	Boost	L3 cache (total)	Core config	Clock (MHz)	Config	Processing power (GFLOPS)	Thermal solution	TDP	Release date	MSRP
Ryzen 7	5705G	8 (16)	3.8	4.6	16 MB	1 × 8	2000	512:32:8; 8 CU	2048	—N/a	65 W		
Ryzen 7	5700G (Note: Model also available as PRO version as 5350GE, 5350G, 5650GE, 5650G, 5750GE, 5750G, released June 1, 2021. Refresh models 5355GE, 5355G, 5655GE, 5655G, 5755GE, 5755G released September 5, 2024.)	8 (16)	3.8	4.6	16 MB	1 × 8	2000	512:32:8; 8 CU	2048	Wraith Stealth	65 W	Apr 13, 2021 (OEM), Aug 5, 2021 (retail)	US $359
Ryzen 7	5705GE	8 (16)	3.2	4.6	16 MB	1 × 8	2000	512:32:8; 8 CU	2048	—N/a	35 W		
Ryzen 7	5700GE	8 (16)	3.2	4.6	16 MB	1 × 8	2000	512:32:8; 8 CU	2048	Wraith Stealth	35 W	Apr 13, 2021	OEM
Ryzen 5	5600GT	6 (12)	3.6	4.6	16 MB	1 × 6	1900	448:28:8; 7 CU	1702.4	Wraith Stealth	65 W	Jan 31, 2024	US $140
Ryzen 5	5605G	6 (12)	3.9	4.4	16 MB	1 × 6	1900	448:28:8; 7 CU	1702.4	—N/a	65 W		
Ryzen 5	5600G	6 (12)	3.9	4.4	16 MB	1 × 6	1900	448:28:8; 7 CU	1702.4	Wraith Stealth	65 W	Apr 13, 2021 (OEM), Aug 5, 2021 (retail)	US $259
Ryzen 5	5605GE	6 (12)	3.4	4.4	16 MB	1 × 6	1900	448:28:8; 7 CU	1702.4	—N/a	35 W		
Ryzen 5	5600GE	6 (12)	3.4	4.4	16 MB	1 × 6	1900	448:28:8; 7 CU	1702.4	Wraith Stealth	35 W	Apr 13, 2021	OEM
Ryzen 5	5500GT	6 (12)	3.6	4.4	16 MB	1 × 6	1900	448:28:8; 7 CU	1702.4	Wraith Stealth	65 W	Jan 08, 2024	US $125
Ryzen 3	5305G	4 (8)	4.0	4.2	8 MB	1 × 4	1700	384:24:8; 6 CU	1305.6	—N/a	65 W		
Ryzen 3	5300G	4 (8)	4.0	4.2	8 MB	1 × 4	1700	384:24:8; 6 CU	1305.6	OEM	65 W	Apr 13, 2021	OEM
Ryzen 3	5305GE	4 (8)	3.6	4.2	8 MB	1 × 4	1700	384:24:8; 6 CU	1305.6	—N/a	35 W		
Ryzen 3	5300GE	4 (8)	3.6	4.2	8 MB	1 × 4	1700	384:24:8; 6 CU	1305.6	OEM	35 W	Apr 13, 2021	OEM

==== "Phoenix" (2024) ====
Common features of Ryzen 8000G desktop APUs:

- Socket: AM5.
- All the CPUs support DDR5-5200 RAM in dual-channel mode in 2x1R and 2x2R configuration, but only DDR5-3600 for 4x1R and 4x2R.
- L1 cache: 64 KB (32 KB data + 32 KB instruction) per core.
- L2 cache: 1 MB per core.
- Models with Zen 4c cores (codenamed Phoenix 2) support 14 PCIe 4.0 lanes, while models without them support 20 lanes. 4 of the lanes are reserved as link to the chipset.
- Includes integrated RDNA 3 GPU.
- Includes XDNA AI Engine (Ryzen AI) on models without Zen 4c cores.
- Fabrication process: TSMC 4 nm FinFET.

Branding and model		CPU							GPU			NPU	TDP	Thermal solution	Release date	MSRP
Branding and model		Cores (threads)			Clock rate (GHz)		L3 cache (total)	Core config (Note: Core Complexes (CCX) × cores per CCX, or Zen 4 + Zen 4c cores)	Model	Core config (Note: Unified shaders : Texture mapping units : Render output units : Ray accelerators : AI accelerators and Compute units (CU)) (Note: GPUs based on RDNA 3 have dual-issue stream processors so that up to two shader instructions can be executed per clock cycle under certain parallelism conditions.)	Clock (GHz)	NPU	TDP	Thermal solution	Release date	MSRP
Branding and model		Total	Zen 4	Zen 4c	Base	Boost	L3 cache (total)	Core config	Model	Core config	Clock (GHz)	NPU	TDP	Thermal solution	Release date	MSRP
Ryzen 7	8700G (Note: Model also available as PRO version as 8300G, 8300GE, 8500G, 8500GE, 8600G, 8700G.)	8 (16)	8 (16)	—N/a	4.2	5.1	16 MB	1 × 8	780M	12 CUs; 768:48:24:12	2.9	Ryzen AI; Up to 16 TOPS	65 W	Wraith Spire (before Aug 1, 2025); Wraith Stealth (since Aug 1, 2025)	Jan 31, 2024	US $329
Ryzen 7	PRO 8700GE	8 (16)	8 (16)	—N/a	3.6	5.1	16 MB	1 × 8	780M	12 CUs; 768:48:24:12	2.7	Ryzen AI; Up to 16 TOPS	35 W	—N/a	Apr 16, 2024	US $299
Ryzen 5	8600G	6 (12)	6 (12)	—N/a	4.3	5.0	16 MB	1 × 6	760M	8 CUs; 512:32:16:8	2.8	Ryzen AI; Up to 16 TOPS	65 W	Wraith Stealth	Jan 31, 2024	US $229
Ryzen 5	PRO 8600GE	6 (12)	6 (12)	—N/a	3.9	5.0	16 MB	1 × 6	760M	8 CUs; 512:32:16:8	2.6	Ryzen AI; Up to 16 TOPS	35 W	—N/a	Apr 16, 2024	OEM
Ryzen 5	8500G	6 (12)	2 (4)	4 (8)	4.1 / 3.2 (Note: Zen 4 cores' base frequency / Zen 4c cores' base frequency)	5.0 / 3.7 (Note: Zen 4 cores' boost frequency / Zen 4c cores' boost frequency)	16 MB	2 + 4	740M	4 CUs; 256:16:8:4	2.8	No	65 W	Wraith Stealth	Jan 31, 2024	US $179
Ryzen 5	8500GE	6 (12)	2 (4)	4 (8)	3.9 / 3.1	5.0 / 3.7	16 MB	2 + 4	740M	4 CUs; 256:16:8:4	2.8	No	35 W	—N/a	Apr 16, 2024	OEM
Ryzen 3	8300G	4 (8)	1 (2)	3 (6)	4.0 / 3.2	4.9 / 3.6	8 MB	1 + 3	740M	4 CUs; 256:16:8:4	2.6	No	65 W	Wraith Stealth	Jan 2024 (OEM) / Q1 2024 (retail)	OEM / TBA
Ryzen 3	8300GE	4 (8)	1 (2)	3 (6)	4.0 / 3.2	4.9 / 3.6	8 MB	1 + 3	740M	4 CUs; 256:16:8:4	2.6	No	35 W	—N/a	Apr 16, 2024	OEM

==== Gorgon Point AM5 (AI 400 Series, Zen 5/RDNA3.5/XDNA2 based) ====
Common features of Ryzen AI 400 desktop APUs:

- Socket: AM5.
- All the CPUs support DDR5-5600 RAM in dual-channel mode in 2x1R and 2x2R configuration, but only DDR5-3600 for 4x1R and 4x2R.
- L1 cache: 80 KB per core.
- L2 cache: 1 MB per core.
- Includes integrated RDNA 3.5 GPU.
- Includes XDNA 2 AI Engine (Ryzen AI).
- Fabrication process: TSMC N4P FinFET.

Branding and model		CPU				GPU			NPU (Ryzen AI)	TDP	Release	MSRP
Branding and model		Cores (threads)	Clock rate (GHz)		L3 cache	GPU			NPU (Ryzen AI)	TDP	Release	MSRP
Branding and model		Cores (threads)	Base	Boost	L3 cache	Model	CUs	Clock (GHz)	NPU (Ryzen AI)	TDP	Release	MSRP
Ryzen AI 7	(PRO) 450G	8 (16)	2.0	5.1	16 MB	Radeon 860M	8	3.1	Up to 50 TOPS	65 W	March 2, 2026 (OEM)	OEM
Ryzen AI 7	(PRO) 450GE	8 (16)	2.0	5.1	16 MB	Radeon 860M	8	3.1	Up to 50 TOPS	35 W	March 2, 2026 (OEM)	OEM
Ryzen AI 5	(PRO) 440G	6 (12)	2.0	4.8	16 MB	Radeon 840M	4	2.9	Up to 50 TOPS	65 W	March 2, 2026 (OEM)	OEM
Ryzen AI 5	(PRO) 440GE	6 (12)	2.0	4.8	16 MB	Radeon 840M	4	2.9	Up to 50 TOPS	35 W	March 2, 2026 (OEM)	OEM
Ryzen AI 5	(PRO) 435G	6 (12)	2.0	4.5	8 MB	Radeon 840M	4	2.8	Up to 50 TOPS	65 W	March 2, 2026 (OEM)	OEM
Ryzen AI 5	(PRO) 435GE	6 (12)	2.0	4.5	8 MB	Radeon 840M	4	2.8	Up to 50 TOPS	35 W	March 2, 2026 (OEM)	OEM

=== Non APU or Radeon Graphics branded ===
==== "Raphael" (2022) ====
- Fabrication 5 nm (CCD) and 6 nm (cIOD) by TSMC
- Socket AM5
- Up to sixteen Zen 4 CPU cores
- Dual-channel DDR5 memory controller
- Basic iGPU

Common features of Ryzen 7000 desktop CPUs:

- Socket: AM5.
- All the CPUs support DDR5-5200 RAM in dual-channel mode in 2x1R and 2x2R configuration, but only DDR5-3600 for 4x1R and 4x2R.
- All the CPUs support 28 PCIe 5.0 lanes. 4 of the lanes are reserved as link to the chipset.
- Includes integrated RDNA 2 GPU on the I/O die with 2 CUs and clock speeds of 400 MHz (base), 2.2 GHz (boost). (Note: Self identifies as "AMD Radeon Graphics". See RDNA 2 § Integrated graphics processors (iGPs).) Models with "F" suffixes are without iGPUs.
- L1 cache: 64 KB (32 KB data + 32 KB instruction) per core.
- L2 cache: 1 MB per core.
- Fabrication process: TSMC N5 FinFET (N6 FinFET for the I/O die).

Branding and model		Cores (threads)	Clock rate (GHz)		L3 cache (total)	Chiplets	Core config (Note: Core Complexes (CCX) × cores per CCX)	TDP	Thermal solution	Release date	MSRP
Branding and model		Cores (threads)	Base	Boost	L3 cache (total)	Chiplets	Core config	TDP	Thermal solution	Release date	MSRP
Ryzen 9	7950X3D	16 (32)	4.2	5.7	128 MB (Note: Only one of the two CCXes has additional 64 MB 3D V-Cache. Only the CCX without 3D V-Cache will be able to reach the maximum boost clocks. The CCX with 3D V-Cache will clock lower.)	2 × CCD; 1 × I/OD	2 × 8	120 W	—N/a	Feb 28, 2023	US $699
Ryzen 9	7950X	16 (32)	4.5	5.7	64 MB	2 × CCD; 1 × I/OD	2 × 8	170 W	—N/a	Sep 27, 2022	US $699
Ryzen 9	7900X3D	12 (24)	4.4	5.6	128 MB	2 × CCD; 1 × I/OD	2 × 6	120 W	—N/a	Feb 28, 2023	US $599
Ryzen 9	7900X	12 (24)	4.7	5.6	64 MB	2 × CCD; 1 × I/OD	2 × 6	170 W	—N/a	Sep 27, 2022	US $549
Ryzen 9	7900	12 (24)	3.7	5.4	64 MB	2 × CCD; 1 × I/OD	2 × 6	65 W	Wraith Prism, None (Note: On August 1, 2025, AMD downgraded or ceased including coolers on select models, as a result of its discontinuation of the Wraith Prism and Wraith Spire.)	Jan 10, 2023	US $429
Ryzen 9	PRO 7945	12 (24)	3.7	5.4	64 MB	2 × CCD; 1 × I/OD	2 × 6	65 W	Wraith Spire, Wraith Stealth	Jun 13, 2023	OEM
Ryzen 7	7800X3D	8 (16)	4.2	5.0	96 MB	1 × CCD; 1 × I/OD	1 × 8	120 W	—N/a	Apr 6, 2023	US $449
Ryzen 7	7700X3D	8 (16)	4.0	4.5	96 MB	1 × CCD; 1 × I/OD	1 × 8	120 W	—N/a	Jul 16, 2026	US $329
Ryzen 7	7700X	8 (16)	4.5	5.4	32 MB	1 × CCD; 1 × I/OD	1 × 8	105 W	—N/a	Sep 27, 2022	US $399
Ryzen 7	7700	8 (16)	3.8	5.3	32 MB	1 × CCD; 1 × I/OD	1 × 8	65 W	Wraith Prism, None	Jan 10, 2023	US $329
Ryzen 7	PRO 7745	8 (16)	3.8	5.3	32 MB	1 × CCD; 1 × I/OD	1 × 8	65 W	Wraith Spire, Wraith Stealth	Jun 13, 2023	OEM
Ryzen 5	7600X3D	6 (12)	4.1	4.7	96 MB	1 × CCD; 1 × I/OD	1 × 6	65 W	—N/a	Aug 31, 2024 (Note: Release date for US, where it is only sold though MicroCenter. In Europe it is only available in Germany, and only through MindFactory, which released it on September 5, 2024.)	US $299
Ryzen 5	7600X	6 (12)	4.7	5.3	32 MB	1 × CCD; 1 × I/OD	1 × 6	105 W	—N/a	Sep 27, 2022	US $299
Ryzen 5	7600	6 (12)	3.8	5.1	32 MB	1 × CCD; 1 × I/OD	1 × 6	65 W	Wraith Stealth	Jan 10, 2023	US $229
Ryzen 5	PRO 7645	6 (12)	3.8	5.1	32 MB	1 × CCD; 1 × I/OD	1 × 6	65 W	Wraith Spire, Wraith Stealth	Jun 13, 2023	OEM
Ryzen 5	7500X3D	6 (12)	4.0	4.5	96 MB	1 × CCD; 1 × I/OD	1 × 6	65 W	—N/a	Nov 12, 2025	OEM
Ryzen 5	7500	6 (12)	3.7	5.0	32 MB	1 × CCD; 1 × I/OD	1 × 6	65 W	Wraith Stealth	Sep 10, 2026	US $189
Ryzen 5	7500F	6 (12)	3.7	5.0	32 MB	1 × CCD; 1 × I/OD	1 × 6	65 W	Wraith Stealth	Jul 22, 2023	US $179
Ryzen 5	7400F (Note: The 7400F uses thermal paste between the silicon and the integrated heat spreader, whereas all other 7000 series models use soldered thermal interface material instead.)	6 (12)	3.7	4.7	32 MB	1 × CCD; 1 × I/OD	1 × 6	65 W	Wraith Stealth	Jan 9, 2025	CNY 849 (Mainland China); APJ Only
Ryzen 5	7400 (Note: Model also available as PRO version as PRO 7445.)	6 (12)	3.3	4.3	16 MB	1 × CCD; 1 × I/OD	1 × 6	65 W	Wraith Stealth	Sep 16, 2025	TBA

==== Granite Ridge (9000 series, Zen 5/RDNA2 based, 2024) ====
Common features of Ryzen 9000 desktop CPUs:

- Socket: AM5.
- All the CPUs support DDR5-5600 RAM in dual-channel mode in 2x1R and 2x2R configuration, but only DDR5-3600 for 4x1R and 4x2R.
- All the CPUs support 28 PCIe 5.0 lanes. 4 of the lanes are reserved as link to the chipset.
- Includes integrated RDNA 2 GPU with 2 CUs and base and boost clock speeds of 0.4 GHz and 2.2 GHz, respectively. Models with "F" suffixes are without iGPUs.
- L1 cache: 80 KB (48 KB data + 32 KB instruction) per core.
- L2 cache: 1 MB per core.
- Models with an "X3D" suffix include 2nd-generation 3D V-Cache in the form of a 64 MB cache die, which augments the L3 cache of one CCD.
- Models with an "X3D2" suffix or branded as "Dual Edition" include 2nd-generation 3D V-Cache in the form of two 64 MB cache dies (totaling to 128 MB), one die per CCD, which augment the L3 cache of their respective CCD.
- Fabrication process: TSMC N4X FinFET (N6 FinFET for the I/O die).

Branding and Model		Cores (threads)	Clock rate (GHz)		L3 cache (total)	TDP	Chiplets	Core config (Note: Core Complexes (CCX) × cores per CCX)	Thermal solution	Release date	Launch MSRP
Branding and Model		Cores (threads)	Base	Boost	L3 cache (total)	TDP	Chiplets	Core config	Thermal solution	Release date	Launch MSRP
Ryzen 9	9950X3D2 Dual Edition	16 (32)	4.3	5.6	192 MB (Note: Both CCXes have a 3D V-Cache.)	200 W	2 × CCD; 1 × I/OD	2 × 8	—N/a	April 22, 2026	US $899
Ryzen 9	9950X3D	16 (32)	4.3	5.7	128 MB (Note: Only one of the two CCXes has 3D V-Cache.)	170 W	2 × CCD; 1 × I/OD	2 × 8	—N/a	March 12, 2025	US $699
Ryzen 9	PRO 9965X3D	16 (32)	4.3	5.5	128 MB	170 W	2 × CCD; 1 × I/OD	2 × 8	—N/a	June 30, 2026	OEM
Ryzen 9	PRO 9965	16 (32)	4.3	5.5	64 MB	170 W	2 × CCD; 1 × I/OD	2 × 8	—N/a	June 30, 2026	OEM
Ryzen 9	9950X	16 (32)	4.3	5.7	64 MB	170 W	2 × CCD; 1 × I/OD	2 × 8	—N/a	August 15, 2024	US $649
Ryzen 9	PRO 9955	12 (24)	3.4	5.4	64 MB	120 W	2 × CCD; 1 × I/OD	2 × 6	—N/a	June 30, 2026	OEM
Ryzen 9	PRO 9945	12 (24)	3.4	5.4	64 MB	65 W	2 × CCD; 1 × I/OD	2 × 6	Wraith; Stealth	September 16, 2025	OEM
Ryzen 9	9900X3D	12 (24)	4.4	5.5	128 MB	120 W	2 × CCD; 1 × I/OD	2 × 6	—N/a	March 12, 2025	US $599
Ryzen 9	9900X	12 (24)	4.4	5.6	64 MB	120 W	2 × CCD; 1 × I/OD	2 × 6	—N/a	August 15, 2024	US $499
Ryzen 7	9850X3D	8 (16)	4.7	5.6	96 MB	120 W	1 × CCD; 1 × I/OD	1 × 8	—N/a	January 29, 2026	US $499
Ryzen 7	9800X3D (Note: Model also available as PRO version as PRO 9755X3D.)	8 (16)	4.7	5.2	96 MB	120 W	1 × CCD; 1 × I/OD	1 × 8	—N/a	November 7, 2024	US $479
Ryzen 7	PRO 9755	8 (16)	3.8	5.4	32 MB	120 W	1 × CCD; 1 × I/OD	1 × 8	—N/a	June 30, 2026	OEM
Ryzen 7	PRO 9745	8 (16)	3.8	5.4	32 MB	65 W	1 × CCD; 1 × I/OD	1 × 8	Wraith; Stealth	September 16, 2025	OEM
Ryzen 7	9700X	8 (16)	3.8	5.5	32 MB	65 W (Note: TDP configurable to 105 W)	1 × CCD; 1 × I/OD	1 × 8	—N/a	August 8, 2024	US $359
Ryzen 7	9700F	8 (16)	3.8	5.5	32 MB	65 W	1 × CCD; 1 × I/OD	1 × 8	—N/a	September 16, 2025	TBA
Ryzen 5	PRO 9655	6 (12)	3.9	5.4	32 MB	120 W	1 × CCD; 1 × I/OD	1 × 6	—N/a	June 30, 2026	OEM
Ryzen 5	9600X (Note: Model also available as PRO version as PRO 9645.)	6 (12)	3.9	5.4	32 MB	65 W	1 × CCD; 1 × I/OD	1 × 6	—N/a	August 8, 2024	US $279
Ryzen 5	9600	6 (12)	3.8	5.2	32 MB	65 W	1 × CCD; 1 × I/OD	1 × 6	Wraith; Stealth	February 19, 2025	TBA
Ryzen 5	9500F	6 (12)	3.8	5.0	32 MB	65 W	1 × CCD; 1 × I/OD	1 × 6	Wraith; Stealth	September 16, 2025	CN ¥1,299

== Server APUs ==
=== Opteron X2100-series "Kyoto" (2013) & "Steppe Eagle" (2016) ===
- Fabrication 28 nm
- Socket FT3 (BGA)
- 4 CPU Cores (Jaguar & Puma microarchitecture)
- L1 Cache: 32 KB Data per core and 32 KB Instructions per core
- MMX, SSE, SSE2, SSE3, SSSE3, SSE4a, SSE4.1, SSE4.2, AVX, F16C, CLMUL, AES, MOVBE (Move Big-Endian instruction), XSAVE/XSAVEOPT, ABM, BMI1, AMD-V support
- Single-channel DDR3 memory controller
- Turbo Dock Technology, C6 and CC6 low power states
- GPU based on 2nd generation Graphics Core Next (GCN) architecture

Model	Released	Fab	Step.	CPU				GPU				DDR3 memory support	TDP (W)	Part number	Release price (USD)
Model	Released	Fab	Step.	Cores (threads)	Clock (GHz)	Cache (Note: AMD in its technical documentation uses KB, which it defines as Kilobyte and as equal to 1024 bytes, and MB, which it defines as Megabyte and as equal to 1024 KB.)		Model	Config	Clock (MHz)	Processing power (GFLOPS) (Note: Single-precision performance is calculated from the base (or boost) core clock speed based on a FMA operation.)	DDR3 memory support	TDP (W)	Part number	Release price (USD)
Model	Released	Fab	Step.	Cores (threads)	Clock (GHz)	L1	L2	Model	Config	Clock (MHz)	Processing power (GFLOPS)	DDR3 memory support	TDP (W)	Part number	Release price (USD)
X1150	May 29, 2013	28 nm		4 (4)	2.0	32 KB inst. 32 KB data per core	2 MB	—N/a				1600	9–17	OX1150IPJ44HM	$64
X2150	May 29, 2013	28 nm		4 (4)	1.9	32 KB inst. 32 KB data per core	2 MB	R3 (HD 8400)	128:8:4; 2 CU	266–600	28.9	1600	11–22	OX2150IAJ44HM	$99
X2170	Sep 1, 2016	28 nm		4 (4)	2.4	32 KB inst. 32 KB data per core	2 MB	R5	128:8:4; 2 CU	655–800	153.6	1866	11–25	OX2170IXJ44JB	

=== Opteron X3000-series "Toronto" (2017) ===
- Fabrication 28 nm
- Socket FP4 (BGA)
- Two or Four CPU cores based on the Excavator microarchitecture
- L1 Cache: 32 KB Data per core and 96 KB Instructions per module
- MMX, SSE, SSE2, SSE3, SSSE3, SSE4.1, SSE4.2, SSE4a, AMD64, AMD-V, AES, CLMUL, AVX, AVX2, XOP, FMA3, FMA4, F16C, ABM, BMI1, BMI2, TBM, RDRAND
- Dual-channel DDR4 memory controller
- GPU based on 3rd generation Graphics Core Next (GCN) architecture

Model	Released	Fab	Step.	CPU					GPU				DDR4 memory support	TDP (W)	Part number	Release price (USD)
Model	Released	Fab	Step.	[Modules/FPUs] Cores/threads	Clock rate (GHz)		Cache (Note: AMD in its technical documentation uses KB, which it defines as Kilobyte and as equal to 1024 bytes, and MB, which it defines as Megabyte and as equal to 1024 KB.)		Model	Config	Clock (MHz)	Processing power (GFLOPS) (Note: Single-precision performance is calculated from the base (or boost) core clock speed based on a FMA operation.)	DDR4 memory support	TDP (W)	Part number	Release price (USD)
Model	Released	Fab	Step.	[Modules/FPUs] Cores/threads	Base	Boost	L1	L2	Model	Config	Clock (MHz)	Processing power (GFLOPS)	DDR4 memory support	TDP (W)	Part number	Release price (USD)
X3216	June 2017	28 nm	01h	[1]2	1.6	3.0	96 KB inst. per module 32 KB data per core	1 MB	R5	256:16:4; 4 CU	800	409.6	1600	12–15	OX3216AAY23KA	OEM for HP
X3418		28 nm	01h	[2]4	1.8	3.2	96 KB inst. per module 32 KB data per core	2 MB	R6	384:24:6; 6 CU	800	614.4	2400	12–35	OX3418AAY43KA	OEM for HP
X3421	June 2017	28 nm	01h	[2]4	2.1	3.4	96 KB inst. per module 32 KB data per core	2 MB	R7	512:32:8; 8 CU	800	819.2	2400	12–35	OX3421AAY43KA	OEM for HP

== Mobile processors with 3D graphics ==
=== APU or Radeon Graphics branded ===
==== Sabine: "Llano" (2011) ====
- Fabrication 32 nm on GlobalFoundries SOI process
- Socket FS1
- Upgraded Stars (AMD 10h architecture) codenamed Husky CPU cores (K10.5) with no L3 cache, and with Redwood-class integrated graphics on die
- L1 Cache: 64 KB Data per core and 64 KB Instructions per core(BeaverCreek for the dual-core variants and WinterPark for the quad-core variants)
- Integrated PCIe 2.0 controller
- GPU: TeraScale 2
- Select models support Turbo Core technology for faster CPU operation when the thermal specification permits
- Support for 1.35 V DDR3L-1333 memory, in addition to regular 1.5 V DDR3 memory specified
- 2.5 GT/s UMI
- MMX, Enhanced 3DNow!, SSE, SSE2, SSE3, SSE4a, ABM, NX bit, AMD64, AMD-V
- PowerNow!

Model	Released	Fab	Step.	CPU						GPU				DDR3 Memory support	TDP (W)	Part number
Model	Released	Fab	Step.	Cores (threads)	Clock (GHz)	Turbo (GHz)	Cache (Note: AMD in its technical documentation uses KB, which it defines as Kilobyte and as equal to 1024 bytes, and MB, which it defines as Megabyte and as equal to 1024 KB.)			Model	Config	Clock (MHz)	GFLOPS (Note: Single-precision performance is calculated from the base (or boost) core clock speed based on a FMA operation.)	DDR3 Memory support	TDP (W)	Part number
Model	Released	Fab	Step.	Cores (threads)	Clock (GHz)	Turbo (GHz)	L1	L2	L3	Model	Config	Clock (MHz)	GFLOPS	DDR3 Memory support	TDP (W)	Part number
E2-3000M	2011 6/14	32 nm	B0	2 (2)	1.8	2.4	64 KB inst. 64 KB data per core	2× 512KB	—N/a	HD 6380G	160:8:4	400	128	1333	35	EM3000DDX22GX
A4-3300M	2011 6/14	32 nm	B0	2 (2)	1.9	2.5	64 KB inst. 64 KB data per core	2× 1MB	—N/a	HD 6480G	240:12:4	444	213.1	1333	35	AM3300DDX23GX
A4-3305M	December 7, 2011	32 nm	B0	2 (2)	1.9	2.5	64 KB inst. 64 KB data per core	2× 512KB	—N/a	HD 6480G	160:8:4	593	189.7	1333	35	AM3305DDX22GX
A4-3310MX	2011 6/14	32 nm	B0	2 (2)	2.1	2.5	64 KB inst. 64 KB data per core	2× 1MB	—N/a	HD 6480G	240:12:4	444	213.1	1333	45	AM3310HLX23GX
A4-3320M	December 7, 2011	32 nm	B0	2 (2)	2.0	2.6	64 KB inst. 64 KB data per core	2× 1MB	—N/a	HD 6480G	240:12:4	444	213.1	1333	35	AM3320DDX23GX
A4-3330MX	December 7, 2011	32 nm	B0	2 (2)	2.2	2.6	64 KB inst. 64 KB data per core	2× 1MB	—N/a	HD 6480G	240:12:4	444	213.1	1333	45	AM3330HLX23GX
A4-3330MX		32 nm	B0	2 (2)	2.3	2.6	64 KB inst. 64 KB data per core	2× 512KB	—N/a	HD 6480G	160:8:4	593	189.7	1333	45	AM3330HLX23HX
A6-3400M	2011 6/14	32 nm	B0	4 (4)	1.4	2.3	64 KB inst. 64 KB data per core	4× 1MB	—N/a	HD 6520G	320:16:8	400	256	1333	35	AM3400DDX43GX
A6-3410MX	2011 6/14	32 nm	B0	4 (4)	1.6	2.3	64 KB inst. 64 KB data per core	4× 1MB	—N/a	HD 6520G	320:16:8	400	256	1600	45	AM3410HLX43GX
A6-3420M	December 7, 2011	32 nm	B0	4 (4)	1.5	2.4	64 KB inst. 64 KB data per core	4× 1MB	—N/a	HD 6520G	320:16:8	400	256	1333	35	AM3420DDX43GX
A6-3430MX	December 7, 2011	32 nm	B0	4 (4)	1.7	2.4	64 KB inst. 64 KB data per core	4× 1MB	—N/a	HD 6520G	320:16:8	400	256	1600	45	AM3430HLX43GX
A8-3500M	2011 6/14	32 nm	B0	4 (4)	1.5	2.4	64 KB inst. 64 KB data per core	4× 1MB	—N/a	HD 6620G	400:20:8	444	355.2	1333	35	AM3500DDX43GX
A8-3510MX	2011 6/14	32 nm	B0	4 (4)	1.8	2.5	64 KB inst. 64 KB data per core	4× 1MB	—N/a	HD 6620G	400:20:8	444	355.2	1600	45	AM3510HLX43GX
A8-3520M	December 7, 2011	32 nm	B0	4 (4)	1.6	2.5	64 KB inst. 64 KB data per core	4× 1MB	—N/a	HD 6620G	400:20:8	444	355.2	1333	35	AM3520DDX43GX
A8-3530MX	2011 6/14	32 nm	B0	4 (4)	1.9	2.6	64 KB inst. 64 KB data per core	4× 1MB	—N/a	HD 6620G	400:20:8	444	355.2	1600	45	AM3530HLX43GX
A8-3550MX	December 7, 2011	32 nm	B0	4 (4)	2.0	2.7	64 KB inst. 64 KB data per core	4× 1MB	—N/a	HD 6620G	400:20:8	444	355.2	1600	45	AM3550HLX43GX

==== Comal: "Trinity" (2012) ====
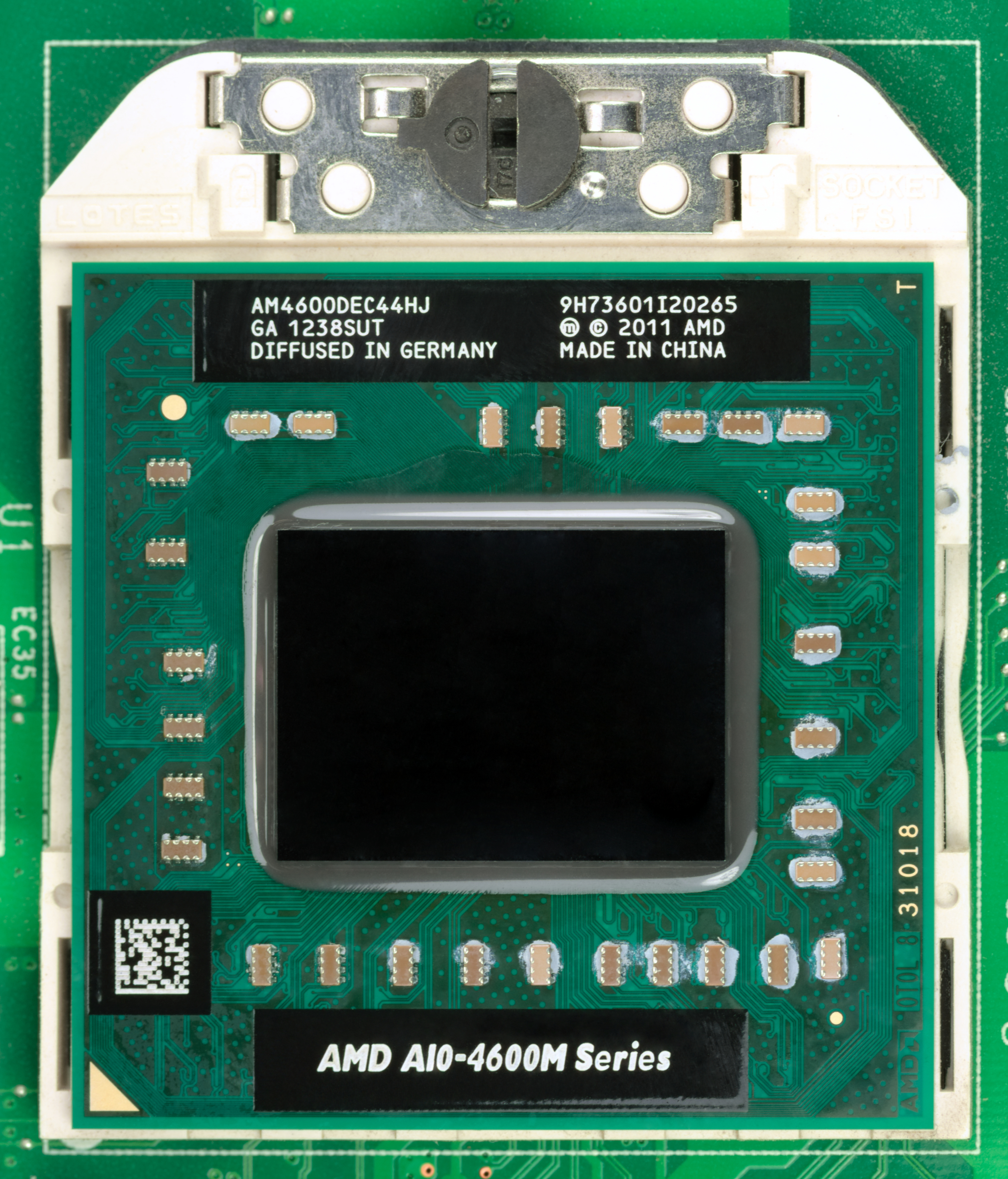
An AMD A10-4600M APU

- Fabrication 32 nm on GlobalFoundries SOI process
- Socket FS1r2, FP2
- Based on the Piledriver architecture
- L1 Cache: 16 KB Data per core and 64 KB Instructions per module
- GPU: TeraScale 3 (VLIW4)
- MMX, SSE, SSE2, SSE3, SSSE3, SSE4.1, SSE4.2, SSE4a, AMD64, AMD-V, AES, CLMUL, AVX, XOP, FMA3, FMA4, F16C, ABM, BMI1, TBM, Turbo Core
- Memory support: 1.35 V DDR3L-1600 memory, in addition to regular 1.5 V DDR3 memory specified (Dual-channel)
- 2.5 GT/s UMI
- Transistors: 1.303 billion
- Die size: 246 mm^{2}

Model number	Released	Fab	Step.	Socket	CPU					GPU					DDR3 Memory support	TDP (W)	Part number
Model number	Released	Fab	Step.	Socket	[Modules/FPUs] Cores/threads	Clock (GHz)	Turbo (GHz)	Cache (Note: AMD in its technical documentation uses KB, which it defines as Kilobyte and as equal to 1024 bytes, and MB, which it defines as Megabyte and as equal to 1024 KB.)		Model	Config (Note: Unified shader processors (USPs): Texture mapping units (TMUs): Render output units (ROPs). 1 CU (Compute Unit) = 64 USPs: 4 TMUs : 1 ROPs)	Clock (MHz)	Turbo (MHz)	GFLOPS (Note: Single-precision performance is calculated from the base (or boost) core clock speed based on a FMA operation.)	DDR3 Memory support	TDP (W)	Part number
Model number	Released	Fab	Step.	Socket	[Modules/FPUs] Cores/threads	Clock (GHz)	Turbo (GHz)	L1	L2 (MB)	Model	Config	Clock (MHz)	Turbo (MHz)	GFLOPS	DDR3 Memory support	TDP (W)	Part number
A4-4355M	September 27, 2012	32 nm	TN-A1	FP2	[1]2	1.9	2.4	64 KB inst. per module 16 KB data per core	1	HD 7400G	192:12:4; 3 CU	327	424	125.5	1333	17	AM4355SHE23HJ
A6-4455M	May 15, 2012	32 nm	TN-A1	FP2	[1]2	2.1	2.8	64 KB inst. per module 16 KB data per core	2	HD 7500G	256:16:8; 4 CU	327	424	167.4	1333	17	AM4455SHE24HJ
A8-4555M	September 27, 2012	32 nm	TN-A1	FP2	[2]4	1.6	2.4	64 KB inst. per module 16 KB data per core	2× 2MB	HD 7600G	384:24:8; 6 CU	320	424	245.7	1333	19	AM4555SHE44HJ
A8-4557M	Mar 2013	32 nm	TN-A1	FP2	[2]4	1.9	2.8	64 KB inst. per module 16 KB data per core	2× 2MB	HD 7000	256:16:8; 4 CU	497	655	254.4	(L)1600	35	AM4557DFE44HJ
A10-4655M	May 15, 2012	32 nm	TN-A1	FP2	[2]4	2.0	2.8	64 KB inst. per module 16 KB data per core	2× 2MB	HD 7620G	384:24:8; 6 CU	360	496	276.4	1333	25	AM4655SIE44HJ
A10-4657M	Mar 2013	32 nm	TN-A1	FP2	[2]4	2.3	3.2	64 KB inst. per module 16 KB data per core	2× 2MB	HD 7000	384:24:8; 6 CU	497	686	381.6	(L)1600	35	AM4657DFE44HJ
A4-4300M	May 15, 2012	32 nm	TN-A1	FS1r2	[1]2	2.5	3.0	64 KB inst. per module 16 KB data per core	1	HD 7420G	128:8:4; 2 CU	480	655	122.8	1600	35	AM4300DEC23HJ
A6-4400M	May 15, 2012	32 nm	TN-A1	FS1r2	[1]2	2.7	3.2	64 KB inst. per module 16 KB data per core	1	HD 7520G	192:12:4; 3 CU	496	685	190.4	1600	35	AM4400DEC23HJ
A8-4500M	May 15, 2012	32 nm	TN-A1	FS1r2	[2]4	1.9	2.8	64 KB inst. per module 16 KB data per core	2× 2MB	HD 7640G	256:16:8; 4 CU	496	685	253.9	1600	35	AM4500DEC44HJ
A10-4600M	May 15, 2012	32 nm	TN-A1	FS1r2	[2]4	2.3	3.2	64 KB inst. per module 16 KB data per core	2× 2MB	HD 7660G	384:24:8; 6 CU	496	685	380.9	1600	35	AM4600DEC44HJ

==== "Richland" (2013) ====
- Fabrication 32 nm on GlobalFoundries SOI process
- Socket FS1r2, FP2
- Elite Performance APU.
- CPU: Piledriver architecture
  - L1 Cache: 16 KB Data per core and 64 KB Instructions per module
- GPU: TeraScale 3 (VLIW4)
- MMX, SSE, SSE2, SSE3, SSSE3, SSE4.1, SSE4.2, SSE4a, AMD64, AMD-V, AES, CLMUL, AVX, XOP, FMA3, FMA4, F16C, ABM, BMI1, TBM, Turbo Core

Model number	Released	Fab	Step.	Socket	CPU					GPU					DDR3 Memory support	TDP (W)	Part number
Model number	Released	Fab	Step.	Socket	[Modules/FPUs] Cores/threads	Clock (GHz)	Turbo (GHz)	Cache (Note: AMD in its technical documentation uses KB, which it defines as Kilobyte and as equal to 1024 bytes, and MB, which it defines as Megabyte and as equal to 1024 KB.)		Model	Config (Note: Unified shader processors (USPs): Texture mapping units (TMUs): Render output units (ROPs). 1 CU (Compute Unit) = 64 USPs: 4 TMUs : 1 ROPs)	Clock (MHz)	Turbo (MHz)	GFLOPS (Note: Single-precision performance is calculated from the base (or boost) core clock speed based on a FMA operation.)	DDR3 Memory support	TDP (W)	Part number
Model number	Released	Fab	Step.	Socket	[Modules/FPUs] Cores/threads	Clock (GHz)	Turbo (GHz)	L1	L2 (MB)	Model	Config	Clock (MHz)	Turbo (MHz)	GFLOPS	DDR3 Memory support	TDP (W)	Part number
A4-5145M	2013/5	32 nm	RL-A1	FP2	[1]2	2.0	2.6	64 KB inst. per module 16 KB data per core	1	HD 8310G	128:8:4; 2 CU	424	554	108.5	(L)1333	17	AM5145SIE44HL
A6-5345M	2013/5	32 nm	RL-A1	FP2	[1]2	2.2	2.8	64 KB inst. per module 16 KB data per core	1	HD 8410G	192:12:4; 3 CU	450	600	172.8	(L)1333	17	AM5345SIE44HL
A8-5545M	2013/5	32 nm	RL-A1	FP2	[2]4	1.7	2.7	64 KB inst. per module 16 KB data per core	4	HD 8510G	384:28:8; 6 CU	450	554	345.6	(L)1333	19	AM5545SIE44HL
A10-5745M	2013/5	32 nm	RL-A1	FP2	[2]4	2.1	2.9	64 KB inst. per module 16 KB data per core	4	HD 8610G	384:28:8; 6 CU	533	626	409.3	(L)1333	25	AM5745SIE44HL
A4-5150M	2013 Q1	32 nm	RL-A1	FS1r2	[1]2	2.7	3.3	64 KB inst. per module 16 KB data per core	1	HD 8350G	128:8:4; 2 CU	533	720	136.4	1600	35	AM5150DEC23HL
A6-5350M	2013 Q1	32 nm	RL-A1	FS1r2	[1]2	2.9	3.5	64 KB inst. per module 16 KB data per core	1	HD 8450G	192:12:4; 3 CU	533	720	204.6	1600	35	AM5350DEC23HL
A6-5357M	2013/5	32 nm	RL-A1	FP2	[1]2	2.9	3.5	64 KB inst. per module 16 KB data per core	1	HD 8450G	192:12:4; 3 CU	533	720	204.6	(L)1600	35	AM5357DFE23HL
A8-5550M	2013 Q1	32 nm	RL-A1	FS1r2	[2]4	2.1	3.1	64 KB inst. per module 16 KB data per core	4	HD 8550G	256:16:8; 4 CU	515	720	263.6	1600	35	AM5550DEC44HL
A8-5557M	2013/5	32 nm	RL-A1	FP2	[2]4	2.1	3.1	64 KB inst. per module 16 KB data per core	4	HD 8550G	256:16:8; 4 CU	554	720	283.6	(L)1600	35	AM5557DFE44HL
A10-5750M	2013 Q1	32 nm	RL-A1	FS1r2	[2]4	2.5	3.5	64 KB inst. per module 16 KB data per core	4	HD 8650G	384:24:8; 6 CU	533	720	409.3	1866	35	AM5750DEC44HL
A10-5757M	2013/5	32 nm	RL-A1	FP2	[2]4	2.5	3.5	64 KB inst. per module 16 KB data per core	4	HD 8650G	384:24:8; 6 CU	600	720	460.8	(L)1600	35	AM5757DFE44HL

==== "Kaveri" (2014) ====
- Fabrication 28 nm
- Socket FP3
- Up to 4 Steamroller x86 CPU cores with 4 MB of L2 cache.
- L1 Cache: 16 KB Data per core and 96 KB Instructions per module
- MMX, SSE, SSE2, SSE3, SSSE3, SSE4.1, SSE4.2, SSE4a, AMD64, AMD-V, AES, CLMUL, AVX, XOP, FMA3, FMA4, F16C, ABM, BMI1, TBM, Turbo Core
- Three to eight Compute Units (CUs) based on Graphics Core Next (GCN) microarchitecture; 1 Compute Unit (CU) consists of 64 Unified Shader Processors : 4 Texture Mapping Units (TMUs) : 1 Render Output Unit (ROPs)
- AMD Heterogeneous System Architecture (HSA) 2.0
- SIP blocks: Unified Video Decoder, Video Coding Engine, TrueAudio
- Dual-channel (2x64-bit) DDR3 memory controller
- Integrated custom ARM Cortex-A5 co-processor with TrustZone Security Extensions

Model number	Released	Fab	CPU					GPU					DDR3 Memory support	TDP (W)	Part number
Model number	Released	Fab	[Modules/FPUs] Cores/threads	Clock (GHz)	Turbo (GHz)	Cache (Note: AMD in its technical documentation uses KB, which it defines as Kilobyte and as equal to 1024 bytes, and MB, which it defines as Megabyte and as equal to 1024 KB.)		Model	Config	Clock (MHz)	Turbo (MHz)	GFLOPS (Note: Single-precision performance is calculated from the base (or boost) core clock speed based on a FMA operation.)	DDR3 Memory support	TDP (W)	Part number
Model number	Released	Fab	[Modules/FPUs] Cores/threads	Clock (GHz)	Turbo (GHz)	L1	L2 (MB)	Model	Config	Clock (MHz)	Turbo (MHz)	GFLOPS	DDR3 Memory support	TDP (W)	Part number
A6-7000	June 2014	28 nm	[1]2	2.2	3.0	96 KB inst. per module 16 KB data per core	1	R4	192:12:3; 3 CU	494	533	189.6	1333	17	AM7000ECH23JA
A6 PRO - 7050B	June 2014	28 nm	[1]2	2.2	3.0	96 KB inst. per module 16 KB data per core	1	R4	192:12:3; 3 CU	533	—N/a	204.6	1600	17	AM705BECH23JA
A8-7100	June 2014	28 nm	[2]4	1.8	3.0	96 KB inst. per module 16 KB data per core	2× 2 MB	R5	256:16:4; 4 CU	450	514	230.4	1600	20	AM7100ECH44JA
A8 PRO - 7150B	June 2014	28 nm	[2]4	1.9	3.2	96 KB inst. per module 16 KB data per core	2× 2 MB	R5	256:16:4; 4 CU	553	—N/a	283.1	1600	20	AM715BECH44JA
A10-7300	June 2014	28 nm	[2]4	1.9	3.2	96 KB inst. per module 16 KB data per core	2× 2 MB	R6	384:24:8; 6 CU	464	533	356.3	1600	20	AM7300ECH44JA
A10 PRO - 7350B	June 2014	28 nm	[2]4	2.1	3.3	96 KB inst. per module 16 KB data per core	2× 2 MB	R6	384:24:8; 6 CU	533	—N/a	424.7	1600	20	AM735BECH44JA
FX-7500	June 2014	28 nm	[2]4	2.1	3.3	96 KB inst. per module 16 KB data per core	2× 2 MB	R7	384:24:8; 6 CU	498	553	382.4	1600	20	FM7500ECH44JA
A8-7200P	June 2014	28 nm	[2]4	2.4	3.3	96 KB inst. per module 16 KB data per core	2× 2 MB	R5	256:16:4; 4 CU	553	626	283.1	1866	35	AM740PDGH44JA
A10-7400P	June 2014	28 nm	[2]4	2.5	3.4	96 KB inst. per module 16 KB data per core	2× 2 MB	R6	384:24:8; 6 CU	576	654	442.3	1866	35	AM740PDGH44JA
FX-7600P	June 2014	28 nm	[2]4	2.7	3.6	96 KB inst. per module 16 KB data per core	2× 2 MB	R7	512:32:8; 8 CU	600	686	614.4	2133	35	FM760PDGH44JA

==== "Carrizo" (2015) ====
- Fabrication 28 nm
- Socket FP4
- Up to 4 Excavator x86 CPU cores
- L1 Cache: 32 KB Data per core and 96 KB Instructions per module
- MMX, SSE, SSE2, SSE3, SSSE3, SSE4.1, SSE4.2, SSE4a, AMD64, AMD-V, AES, CLMUL, AVX, AVX2, XOP, FMA3, FMA4, F16C, ABM, BMI1, BMI2, TBM, RDRAND, Turbo Core
- GPU based on Graphics Core Next 1.2

Model number	Released	Fab	CPU					GPU				DDR Memory support	TDP (W)	Part number
Model number	Released	Fab	[Modules/FPUs] Cores/threads	Clock (GHz)	Turbo (GHz)	Cache (Note: AMD in its technical documentation uses KB, which it defines as Kilobyte and as equal to 1024 bytes, and MB, which it defines as Megabyte and as equal to 1024 KB.)		Model	Config	Clock (MHz)	GFLOPS (Note: Single-precision performance is calculated from the base (or boost) core clock speed based on a FMA operation.)	DDR Memory support	TDP (W)	Part number
Model number	Released	Fab	[Modules/FPUs] Cores/threads	Clock (GHz)	Turbo (GHz)	L1	L2 (MB)	Model	Config	Clock (MHz)	GFLOPS	DDR Memory support	TDP (W)	Part number
A6-8500P	June 2015	28 nm	[1]2	1.6	3.0	96 KB inst. per module 32 KB data per core	1	R5	256:16:4; 4 CU	800	409.6	3)1600	12- 35	AM850PAAY23KA
PRO A6-8500B	June 2015	28 nm	[1]2	1.6	3.0	96 KB inst. per module 32 KB data per core	1	R5	256:16:4; 4 CU	800	409.6	3)1600	12- 35	AM850BAAY23KA
PRO A6-8530B	Q3 2016	28 nm	[1]2	2.3	3.2	96 KB inst. per module 32 KB data per core	1	R5	256:16:4; 4 CU	800	409.6	4)1866	12- 35	AM853BADY23AB
A8-8600P	June 2015	28 nm	[2]4	1.6	3.0	96 KB inst. per module 32 KB data per core	2× 1MB	R6	384:24:8; 6 CU	720	552.9	3)2133	12- 35	AM860PAAY43KA
PRO A8-8600B	June 2015	28 nm	[2]4	1.6	3.0	96 KB inst. per module 32 KB data per core	2× 1MB	R6	384:24:8; 6 CU	720	552.9	3)2133	12- 35	AM860BAAY43KA
A10-8700P	June 2015	28 nm	[2]4	1.8	3.2	96 KB inst. per module 32 KB data per core	2× 1MB	R6	384:24:8; 6 CU	800	614.4	3)2133	12- 35	AM870PAAY43KA
PRO A10-8700B	June 2015	28 nm	[2]4	1.8	3.2	96 KB inst. per module 32 KB data per core	2× 1MB	R6	384:24:8; 6 CU	800	614.4	3)2133	12- 35	AM870BAAY43KA
PRO A10-8730B	Q3 2016	28 nm	[2]4	2.4	3.3	96 KB inst. per module 32 KB data per core	2× 1MB	R5	384:24:8; 6 CU	720	552.9	4)1866	12- 35	AM873BADY44AB
A10-8780P	December 2015	28 nm	[2]4	2.0	3.3	96 KB inst. per module 32 KB data per core	2× 1MB	R8	512:32:8; 8 CU			3)?	12- 35	AM878PAIY43KA
FX-8800P	June 2015	28 nm	[2]4	2.1	3.4	96 KB inst. per module 32 KB data per core	2× 1MB	R7	512:32:8; 8 CU	800	819.2	4)2133	12- 35	FM880PAAY43KA
PRO A12-8800B	June 2015	28 nm	[2]4	2.1	3.4	96 KB inst. per module 32 KB data per core	2× 1MB	R7	512:32:8; 8 CU	800	819.2	4)2133	12- 35	FM880BAAY43KA
PRO A12-8830B	Q3 2016	28 nm	[2]4	2.5	3.4	96 KB inst. per module 32 KB data per core	2× 1MB	R7	384:24:8; 6 CU	758	582.1	4)1866	12- 35	AM883BADY44AB

==== "Bristol Ridge" (2016) ====
- Fabrication 28 nm
- Socket FP4
- Two or four "Excavator+" x86 CPU cores
- L1 Cache: 32 KB Data per core and 96 KB Instructions per module
- MMX, SSE, SSE2, SSE3, SSSE3, SSE4.1, SSE4.2, SSE4a, AMD64, AMD-V, AES, CLMUL, AVX, AVX2, XOP, FMA3, FMA4, F16C, ABM, BMI1, BMI2, TBM, RDRAND, Turbo Core
- GPU based on Graphics Core Next 1.2 with VP9 decoding

Model number	Released	Fab	CPU					GPU				DDR4 Memory support	TDP (W)	Part number
Model number	Released	Fab	[Modules/FPUs] Cores/threads	Clock (GHz)	Turbo (GHz)	Cache (Note: AMD in its technical documentation uses KB, which it defines as Kilobyte and as equal to 1024 bytes, and MB, which it defines as Megabyte and as equal to 1024 KB.)		Model	Config	Clock (MHz)	GFLOPS (Note: Single-precision performance is calculated from the base (or boost) core clock speed based on a FMA operation.)	DDR4 Memory support	TDP (W)	Part number
Model number	Released	Fab	[Modules/FPUs] Cores/threads	Clock (GHz)	Turbo (GHz)	L1	L2 (MB)	Model	Config	Clock (MHz)	GFLOPS	DDR4 Memory support	TDP (W)	Part number
Pro A6-9500B	October 24, 2016	28 nm	[1]2	2.3	3.2	96 KB inst. per module 32 KB data per core	1	R5	256:16:4; 4 CU	800	409.6	1866	12- 15	
Pro A8-9600B	October 24, 2016	28 nm	[2]4	2.4	3.3	96 KB inst. per module 32 KB data per core	2× 1 MB	R5	384:24:6; 6 CU	720	552.9	1866	12– 15	
A10-9600P	June 2016	28 nm	[2]4	2.4	3.3	96 KB inst. per module 32 KB data per core	2× 1 MB	R5	384:24:6; 6 CU	720	552.9	1866	12– 15	AM960PADY44AB
A10-9620P	2017 (OEM)	28 nm	[2]4	2.5	3.4	96 KB inst. per module 32 KB data per core	2× 1 MB	R5	384:24:6; 6 CU	758	582.1	1866	12– 15	
Pro A10-9700B	October 24, 2016	28 nm	[2]4	2.5	3.4	96 KB inst. per module 32 KB data per core	2× 1 MB	R7	384:24:6; 6 CU	758	582.1	1866	12– 15	
A12-9700P	June 2016	28 nm	[2]4	2.5	3.4	96 KB inst. per module 32 KB data per core	2× 1 MB	R7	384:24:6; 6 CU	758	582.1	1866	12– 15	AM970PADY44AB
Pro A8-9630B	October 24, 2016	28 nm	[2]4	2.6	3.3	96 KB inst. per module 32 KB data per core	2× 1 MB	R5	384:24:6; 6 CU	800	614.4	2400	25– 45	
A10-9630P	June 2016	28 nm	[2]4	2.6	3.3	96 KB inst. per module 32 KB data per core	2× 1 MB	R5	384:24:6; 6 CU	800	614.4	2400	25– 45	AM963PAEY44AB
Pro A10-9730B	October 24, 2016	28 nm	[2]4	2.8	3.5	96 KB inst. per module 32 KB data per core	2× 1 MB	R7	384:24:6; 6 CU	900	691.2	2400	25– 45	
A12-9730P	June 2016	28 nm	[2]4	2.8	3.5	96 KB inst. per module 32 KB data per core	2× 1 MB	R7	384:24:6; 6 CU	900	691.2	2400	25– 45	AM973PAEY44AB
Pro A12-9800B	October 24, 2016	28 nm	[2]4	2.7	3.6	96 KB inst. per module 32 KB data per core	2× 1 MB	R7	512:32:8; 8 CU	758	776.1	1866	12– 15	
FX-9800P A12-9720P	June 2016; 2017 (OEM)	28 nm	[2]4	2.7	3.6	96 KB inst. per module 32 KB data per core	2× 1 MB	R7	512:32:8; 8 CU	758	776.1	1866	12– 15	FM980PADY44AB ?
Pro A12-9830B	October 24, 2016	28 nm	[2]4	3.0	3.7	96 KB inst. per module 32 KB data per core	2× 1 MB	R7	512:32:8; 8 CU	900	921.6	2400	25– 45	
FX-9830P	June 2016	28 nm	[2]4	3.0	3.7	96 KB inst. per module 32 KB data per core	2× 1 MB	R7	512:32:8; 8 CU	900	921.6	2400	25– 45	FM983PAEY44AB

==== "Raven Ridge" (2017) ====
- Fabrication 14 nm by GlobalFoundries
- Transistors: 4.94 billion
- Socket FP5
- Die size: 210 mm^{2}
- Zen CPU cores
- MMX, SSE, SSE2, SSE3, SSSE3, SSE4.1, SSE4.2, SSE4a, AMD64, AMD-V, AES, CLMUL, AVX, AVX2, FMA3, F16C, ABM, BMI1, BMI2, RDRAND, Turbo Core
- Fifth generation GCN-based GPU

Model	Release date	Fab	CPU						GPU				Socket	PCIe lanes	Memory support	TDP
Model	Release date	Fab	Cores (threads)	Clock rate (GHz)		Cache			Model	Config (Note: Unified shaders : Texture mapping units : Render output units and Compute units (CU))	Clock (MHz)	Processing power (GFLOPS) (Note: Single precision performance is calculated from the base (or boost) core clock speed based on a FMA operation.)	Socket	PCIe lanes	Memory support	TDP
Model	Release date	Fab	Cores (threads)	Base	Boost	L1	L2	L3	Model	Config	Clock (MHz)	Processing power (GFLOPS)	Socket	PCIe lanes	Memory support	TDP
Athlon Pro 200U	2019	GloFo; 14LP	2 (4)	2.3	3.2	64 KB inst. 32 KB data per core	512 KB per core	4 MB	Radeon Vega 3	192:12:4; 3 CU	1000	384	FP5	12 (8+4)	DDR4-2400 dual-channel	12–25 W
Athlon 300U	Jan 6, 2019	GloFo; 14LP	2 (4)	2.4	3.3	64 KB inst. 32 KB data per core	512 KB per core	4 MB	Radeon Vega 3	192:12:4; 3 CU	1000	384	FP5	12 (8+4)	DDR4-2400 dual-channel	12–25 W
Ryzen 3 2200U	Jan 8, 2018	GloFo; 14LP	2 (4)	2.5	3.4	64 KB inst. 32 KB data per core	512 KB per core	4 MB	Radeon Vega 3	192:12:4; 3 CU	1100	422.4	FP5	12 (8+4)	DDR4-2400 dual-channel	12–25 W
Ryzen 3 3200U	Jan 6, 2019	GloFo; 14LP	2 (4)	2.6	3.5	64 KB inst. 32 KB data per core	512 KB per core	4 MB	Radeon Vega 3	192:12:4; 3 CU	1200	460.8	FP5	12 (8+4)	DDR4-2400 dual-channel	12–25 W
Ryzen 3 2300U	Jan 8, 2018	GloFo; 14LP	4 (4)	2.0	3.4	64 KB inst. 32 KB data per core	512 KB per core	4 MB	Radeon Vega 6	384:24:8; 6 CU	1100	844.8	FP5	12 (8+4)	DDR4-2400 dual-channel	12–25 W
Ryzen 3 Pro 2300U	May 15, 2018	GloFo; 14LP	4 (4)	2.0	3.4	64 KB inst. 32 KB data per core	512 KB per core	4 MB	Radeon Vega 6	384:24:8; 6 CU	1100	844.8	FP5	12 (8+4)	DDR4-2400 dual-channel	12–25 W
Ryzen 5 2500U	Oct 26, 2017	GloFo; 14LP	4 (8)	2.0	3.6	64 KB inst. 32 KB data per core	512 KB per core	4 MB	Radeon Vega 8	512:32:16; 8 CU	1100	1126.4	FP5	12 (8+4)	DDR4-2400 dual-channel	12–25 W
Ryzen 5 Pro 2500U	May 15, 2018	GloFo; 14LP	4 (8)	2.0	3.6	64 KB inst. 32 KB data per core	512 KB per core	4 MB	Radeon Vega 8	512:32:16; 8 CU	1100	1126.4	FP5	12 (8+4)	DDR4-2400 dual-channel	12–25 W
Ryzen 5 2600H	Sep 10, 2018	GloFo; 14LP	4 (8)	3.2	3.6	64 KB inst. 32 KB data per core	512 KB per core	4 MB	Radeon Vega 8	512:32:16; 8 CU	1100	1126.4	FP5	12 (8+4)	DDR4-3200 dual-channel	35–54 W
Ryzen 7 2700U	Oct 26, 2017	GloFo; 14LP	4 (8)	2.2	3.8	64 KB inst. 32 KB data per core	512 KB per core	4 MB	Radeon RX Vega 10	640:40:16; 10 CU	1300	1664	FP5	12 (8+4)	DDR4-2400 dual-channel	12–25 W
Ryzen 7 Pro 2700U	May 15, 2018	GloFo; 14LP	4 (8)	2.2	3.8	64 KB inst. 32 KB data per core	512 KB per core	4 MB	Radeon Vega 10	640:40:16; 10 CU	1300	1664	FP5	12 (8+4)	DDR4-2400 dual-channel	12–25 W
Ryzen 7 2800H	Sep 10, 2018	GloFo; 14LP	4 (8)	3.3	3.8	64 KB inst. 32 KB data per core	512 KB per core	4 MB	Radeon RX Vega 11	704:44:16; 11 CU	1300	1830.4	FP5	12 (8+4)	DDR4-3200 dual-channel	35–54 W

==== "Picasso" (2019) ====
- Fabrication 12 nm by GlobalFoundries
- Socket FP5
- Die size: 210 mm^{2}
- Up to four Zen+ CPU cores
- MMX, SSE, SSE2, SSE3, SSSE3, SSE4.1, SSE4.2, SSE4a, AMD64, AMD-V, AES, CLMUL, AVX, AVX2, FMA3, F16C, ABM, BMI1, BMI2, RDRAND, Turbo Core
- Dual-channel DDR4 memory controller
- Fifth generation GCN-based GPU

Common features of Ryzen 3000 notebook APUs:

- Socket: FP5.
- All the CPUs support DDR4-2400 in dual-channel mode.
- L1 cache: 96 KB (32 KB data + 64 KB instruction) per core.
- L2 cache: 512 KB per core.
- All the CPUs support 16 PCIe 3.0 lanes.
- Includes integrated GCN 5th generation GPU.
- Fabrication process: GlobalFoundries 12LP (14LP+).

Branding and Model		CPU					GPU				TDP	Release date
Branding and Model		Cores (threads)	Clock rate (GHz)		L3 cache (total)	Core config (Note: Core Complexes (CCX) × cores per CCX)	Model	Clock (GHz)	Config (Note: Unified Shaders : Texture Mapping Units : Render Output Units and Compute Units (CU))	Processing power (GFLOPS) (Note: Single precision performance is calculated from the base (or boost) core clock speed based on a FMA operation.)	TDP	Release date
Branding and Model		Cores (threads)	Base	Boost	L3 cache (total)	Core config	Model	Clock (GHz)	Config	Processing power (GFLOPS)	TDP	Release date
Ryzen 7	3780U	4 (8)	2.3	4.0	4 MB	1 × 4	RX Vega 11	1.4	704:44:16; 11 CU	1971.2	15 W	Oct 2019
Ryzen 7	3750H	4 (8)	2.3	4.0	4 MB	1 × 4	RX Vega 10	1.4	640:40:16; 10 CU	1792.0	35 W	Jan 6, 2019
Ryzen 7	3700C	4 (8)	2.3	4.0	4 MB	1 × 4	RX Vega 10	1.4	640:40:16; 10 CU	1792.0	15 W	Sep 22, 2020
Ryzen 7	3700U (Note: Model also available as PRO version, released April 8, 2019.)	4 (8)	2.3	4.0	4 MB	1 × 4	RX Vega 10	1.4	640:40:16; 10 CU	1792.0	15 W	Jan 6, 2019
Ryzen 5	3580U	4 (8)	2.1	3.7	4 MB	1 × 4	Vega 9	1.3	576:36:16; 9 CU	1497.6	15 W	Oct 2019
Ryzen 5	3550H	4 (8)	2.1	3.7	4 MB	1 × 4	Vega 8	1.2	512:32:8; 8 CU	1228.8	35 W	Jan 6, 2019
Ryzen 5	3500C	4 (8)	2.1	3.7	4 MB	1 × 4	Vega 8	1.2	512:32:8; 8 CU	1228.8	15 W	Sep 22, 2020
Ryzen 5	3500U	4 (8)	2.1	3.7	4 MB	1 × 4	Vega 8	1.2	512:32:8; 8 CU	1228.8	15 W	Jan 6, 2019
Ryzen 5	3450U	4 (8)	2.1	3.5	4 MB	1 × 4	Vega 8	1.2	512:32:8; 8 CU	1228.8	15 W	Jun 2020
Ryzen 3	3350U	4 (4)	2.1	3.5	4 MB	1 × 4	Vega 6	1.2	384:24:8; 6 CU	921.6	15 W	Jan 6, 2019
Ryzen 3	3300U	4 (4)	2.1	3.5	4 MB	1 × 4	Vega 6	1.2	384:24:8; 6 CU	921.6	15 W	Jan 6, 2019

==== "Renoir" (2020) ====
- Fabrication 7 nm by TSMC
- Socket FP6
- Die size: 156 mm^{2}
- 9.8 billion transistors on one single 7 nm monolithic die
- Up to eight Zen 2 CPU cores
- L1 cache: 64 KB (32 KB data + 32 KB instruction) per core.
- L2 cache: 512 KB per core.
- Fifth generation GCN-based GPU
- Memory support: DDR4-3200 or LPDDR4-4266 in dual-channel mode.
- All the CPUs support 16 PCIe 3.0 lanes.

===== U =====
Branding and model		CPU					GPU				TDP	Release date
Branding and model		Cores (threads)	Clock rate (GHz)		L3 cache (total)	Core config (Note: Core Complexes (CCX) × cores per CCX)	Model	Clock (MHz)	Config (Note: Unified shaders : texture mapping units : render output units and compute units (CU))	Processing power (GFLOPS) (Note: Single precision performance is calculated from the base (or boost) core clock speed based on a FMA operation.)	TDP	Release date
Branding and model		Cores (threads)	Base	Boost	L3 cache (total)	Core config	Model	Clock (MHz)	Config	Processing power (GFLOPS)	TDP	Release date
Ryzen 7	4980U	8 (16)	2.0	4.4	8 MB	2 × 4	Radeon; Graphics (Note: All of the iGPUs are branded as AMD Radeon Graphics.)	1950	512:32:8; 8 CU	1996.8	15 W	Apr 13, 2021
Ryzen 7	4800U	8 (16)	1.8	4.2	8 MB	2 × 4	Radeon; Graphics	1750	512:32:8; 8 CU	1792	15 W	Mar 16, 2020
Ryzen 7	Pro 4750U	8 (16)	1.7	4.1	8 MB	2 × 4	Radeon; Graphics	1600	448:28:8; 7 CU	1433.6	15 W	May 7, 2020
Ryzen 7	4700U	8 (8)	2.0	4.1	8 MB	2 × 4	Radeon; Graphics	1600	448:28:8; 7 CU	1433.6	15 W	Mar 16, 2020
Ryzen 5	4680U	6 (12)	2.1	4.0	8 MB	2 × 3	Radeon; Graphics	1500	448:28:8; 7 CU	1344	15 W	Apr 13, 2021
Ryzen 5	Pro 4650U	6 (12)	2.1	4.0	8 MB	2 × 3	Radeon; Graphics	1500	384:24:8; 6 CU	1152	15 W	May 7, 2020
Ryzen 5	4600U	6 (12)	2.1	4.0	8 MB	2 × 3	Radeon; Graphics	1500	384:24:8; 6 CU	1152	15 W	Mar 16, 2020
Ryzen 5	4500U	6 (6)	2.3	4.0	8 MB	2 × 3	Radeon; Graphics	1500	384:24:8; 6 CU	1152	15 W	Mar 16, 2020
Ryzen 3	Pro 4450U	4 (8)	2.5	3.7	4 MB	1 × 4	Radeon; Graphics	1400	320:20:8; 5 CU	896	15 W	May 7, 2020
Ryzen 3	4300U	4 (4)	2.7	3.7	4 MB	1 × 4	Radeon; Graphics	1400	320:20:8; 5 CU	896	15 W	Mar 16, 2020

===== H =====
Branding and model		CPU					GPU				TDP	Release date
Branding and model		Cores (threads)	Clock rate (GHz)		L3 cache (total)	Core config (Note: Core Complexes (CCX) × cores per CCX)	Model	Clock (MHz)	Config (Note: Unified shaders : texture mapping units : render output units and compute units (CU))	Processing power (GFLOPS) (Note: Single precision performance is calculated from the base (or boost) core clock speed based on a FMA operation.)	TDP	Release date
Branding and model		Cores (threads)	Base	Boost	L3 cache (total)	Core config	Model	Clock (MHz)	Config	Processing power (GFLOPS)	TDP	Release date
Ryzen 9	4900H	8 (16)	3.3	4.4	8 MB	2 × 4	Radeon; Graphics (Note: All of the iGPUs are branded as AMD Radeon Graphics.)	1750	512:32:8; 8 CU	1792	45 W	Mar 16, 2020
Ryzen 9	4900HS	8 (16)	3.0	4.3	8 MB	2 × 4	Radeon; Graphics	1750	512:32:8; 8 CU	1792	35 W	Mar 16, 2020
Ryzen 7	4800H	8 (16)	2.9	4.2	8 MB	2 × 4	Radeon; Graphics	1600	448:28:8; 7 CU	1433.6	45 W	Mar 16, 2020
Ryzen 7	4800HS	8 (16)	2.9	4.2	8 MB	2 × 4	Radeon; Graphics	1600	448:28:8; 7 CU	1433.6	45 W	Mar 16, 2020
Ryzen 5	4600H	6 (12)	3.0	4.0	8 MB	2 × 3	Radeon; Graphics	1500	384:24:8; 6 CU	1152	45 W	Mar 16, 2020
Ryzen 5	4600HS	6 (12)	3.0	4.0	8 MB	2 × 3	Radeon; Graphics	1500	384:24:8; 6 CU	1152	35 W	Mar 16, 2020

==== "Lucienne" (2021) ====
- Fabrication 7 nm by TSMC
- Socket FP6
- Die size: 156 mm^{2}
- 9.8 billion transistors on one single 7 nm monolithic die
- Up to eight Zen 2 CPU cores
- Fifth generation GCN-based GPU (7 nm Vega)

Common features of Ryzen 5000 notebook APUs:

- Socket: FP6.
- All the CPUs support DDR4-3200 or LPDDR4-4266 in dual-channel mode.
- L1 cache: 64 KB (32 KB data + 32 KB instruction) per core.
- L2 cache: 512 KB per core.
- All the CPUs support 16 PCIe 3.0 lanes.
- Includes integrated GCN 5th generation GPU.
- Fabrication process: TSMC 7FF.

Branding and Model		CPU					GPU				TDP	Release date
Branding and Model		Cores (threads)	Clock rate (GHz)		L3 cache (total)	Core config (Note: Core Complexes (CCX) × cores per CCX)	Model	Clock (GHz)	Config (Note: Unified shaders : texture mapping units : render output units and compute units (CU))	Processing power (GFLOPS) (Note: Single precision performance is calculated from the base (or boost) core clock speed based on a FMA operation.)	TDP	Release date
Branding and Model		Cores (threads)	Base	Boost	L3 cache (total)	Core config	Model	Clock (GHz)	Config	Processing power (GFLOPS)	TDP	Release date
Ryzen 7	5700U	8 (16)	1.8	4.3	8 MB	2 × 4	Radeon; Graphics (Note: All of the iGPUs are branded as AMD Radeon Graphics.)	1.9	512:32:8; 8 CU	1945.6	10–25 W	Jan 12, 2021
Ryzen 5	5500U	6 (12)	2.1	4.0	8 MB	2 × 3	Radeon; Graphics	1.8	448:28:8; 7 CU	1612.8	10–25 W	Jan 12, 2021
Ryzen 3	5300U	4 (8)	2.6	3.8	4 MB	1 × 4	Radeon; Graphics	1.5	384:24:8; 6 CU	1152	10–25 W	Jan 12, 2021

==== "Cezanne" (2021) ====
- Fabrication 7 nm by TSMC
- Socket FP6
- Die size: 180 mm^{2}
- Up to eight Zen 3 CPU cores
- L1 cache: 64 KB (32 KB data + 32 KB instruction) per core.
- L2 cache: 512 KB per core.
- Fifth generation GCN-based GPU
- Memory support: DDR4-3200 or LPDDR4-4266 in dual-channel mode.
- All the CPUs support 16 PCIe 3.0 lanes.

===== U =====
Branding and model		CPU					GPU				TDP	Release date
Branding and model		Cores (Threads)	Clock rate (GHz)		L3 cache (total)	Core config (Note: Core Complexes (CCX) × cores per CCX)	Model	Clock (GHz)	Config (Note: Unified shaders : texture mapping units : render output units and compute units (CU))	Processing power (GFLOPS) (Note: Single precision performance is calculated from the base (or boost) core clock speed based on a FMA operation.)	TDP	Release date
Branding and model		Cores (Threads)	Base	Boost	L3 cache (total)	Core config	Model	Clock (GHz)	Config	Processing power (GFLOPS)	TDP	Release date
Ryzen 7	5800U (Note: Model also available as Pro version as 5450U, 5650U, 5850U, released on March 16, 2021.)	8 (16)	1.9	4.4	16 MB	1 × 8	Radeon; Graphics (Note: All of the iGPUs are branded as AMD Radeon Graphics.)	2.0	512:32:8; 8 CUs	2048	10–25 W	Jan 12, 2021
Ryzen 5	5600U	6 (12)	2.3	4.2	16 MB	1 × 6	Radeon; Graphics	1.8	448:28:8; 7 CUs	1612.8	10–25 W	Jan 12, 2021
Ryzen 5	5560U	6 (12)	2.3	4.0	8 MB	1 × 6	Radeon; Graphics	1.6	384:24:8; 6 CUs	1228.8	10–25 W	Jan 12, 2021
Ryzen 3	5400U	4 (8)	2.7	4.1	8 MB	1 × 4	Radeon; Graphics	1.6	384:24:8; 6 CUs	1228.8	10–25 W	Jan 12, 2021

===== H =====
Branding and model		CPU					GPU				TDP	Release date
Branding and model		Cores (Threads)	Clock rate (GHz)		L3 cache (total)	Core config (Note: Core Complexes (CCX) × cores per CCX)	Model	Clock (GHz)	Config (Note: Unified shaders : texture mapping units : render output units and compute units (CU))	Processing power (GFLOPS) (Note: Single precision performance is calculated from the base (or boost) core clock speed based on a FMA operation.)	TDP	Release date
Branding and model		Cores (Threads)	Base	Boost	L3 cache (total)	Core config	Model	Clock (GHz)	Config	Processing power (GFLOPS)	TDP	Release date
Ryzen 9	5980HX	8 (16)	3.3	4.8	16 MB	1 × 8	Radeon; Graphics (Note: All of the iGPUs are branded as AMD Radeon Graphics.)	2.1	512:32:8; 8 CUs	2150.4	35–54 W	Jan 12, 2021
Ryzen 9	5980HS	8 (16)	3.0	4.8	16 MB	1 × 8	Radeon; Graphics	2.1	512:32:8; 8 CUs	2150.4	35 W	Jan 12, 2021
Ryzen 9	5900HX	8 (16)	3.3	4.6	16 MB	1 × 8	Radeon; Graphics	2.1	512:32:8; 8 CUs	2150.4	35–54 W	Jan 12, 2021
Ryzen 9	5900HS	8 (16)	3.0	4.6	16 MB	1 × 8	Radeon; Graphics	2.1	512:32:8; 8 CUs	2150.4	35 W	Jan 12, 2021
Ryzen 7	5800H	8 (16)	3.2	4.4	16 MB	1 × 8	Radeon; Graphics	2.0	512:32:8; 8 CUs	2048	35–54 W	Jan 12, 2021
Ryzen 7	5800HS	8 (16)	2.8	4.4	16 MB	1 × 8	Radeon; Graphics	2.0	512:32:8; 8 CUs	2048	35 W	Jan 12, 2021
Ryzen 5	5600H	6 (12)	3.3	4.2	16 MB	1 × 6	Radeon; Graphics	1.8	448:28:8; 7 CUs	1612.8	35–54 W	Jan 12, 2021
Ryzen 5	5600HS	6 (12)	3.0	4.2	16 MB	1 × 6	Radeon; Graphics	1.8	448:28:8; 7 CUs	1612.8	35 W	Jan 12, 2021

==== "Barceló" (2022) ====
- Fabrication 7 nm by TSMC
- Socket FP6
- Die size: 180 mm^{2}
- Up to eight Zen 3 CPU cores
- L1 cache: 64 KB (32 KB data + 32 KB instruction) per core.
- L2 cache: 512 KB per core.
- Fifth generation GCN-based GPU
- Memory support: DDR4-3200 or LPDDR4-4266 in dual-channel mode.
- All the CPUs support 16 PCIe 3.0 lanes.

Branding and model		CPU					GPU				TDP	Release date
Branding and model		Cores (Threads)	Clock rate (GHz)		L3 cache (total)	Core config (Note: Core Complexes (CCX) × cores per CCX)	Model	Clock (GHz)	Config (Note: Unified shaders : texture mapping units : render output units and compute units (CU))	Processing power (GFLOPS) (Note: Single precision performance is calculated from the base (or boost) core clock speed based on a FMA operation.)	TDP	Release date
Branding and model		Cores (Threads)	Base	Boost	L3 cache (total)	Core config	Model	Clock (GHz)	Config	Processing power (GFLOPS)	TDP	Release date
Ryzen 7	5825U (Note: Model also available as Pro version as 5475U, 5675U, 5875U, released on April 19, 2022.) (Note: Model also available as Chromebook optimized version as 5425C, 5625C, 5825C, released on May 5, 2022.)	8 (16)	2.0	4.5	16 MB	1 × 8	Radeon; Graphics (Note: All of the iGPUs are branded as AMD Radeon Graphics.)	2.0	512:32:8; 8 CUs	2048	15 W	Jan 4, 2022
Ryzen 5	5625U	6 (12)	2.3	4.3	16 MB	1 × 6	Radeon; Graphics	1.8	448:28:8; 7 CUs	1612.8	15 W	Jan 4, 2022
Ryzen 3	5425U	4 (8)	2.7	4.1	8 MB	1 × 4	Radeon; Graphics	1.6	384:24:6; 6 CUs	?	15 W	Jan 30, 2022
Ryzen 3	5125C	2 (4)	3.0	—N/a	8 MB	1 × 2	Radeon; Graphics	?	192:12:8; 3 CU	?	15 W	May 5, 2022

==== "Rembrandt" (2022) ====
- Fabrication 6 nm by TSMC
- Socket FP7
- Die size: 210 mm^{2}
- Up to eight Zen 3+ CPU cores
- Second generation RDNA-based GPU

Common features of Ryzen 6000 notebook APUs:

- Socket: FP7, FP7r2.
- All the CPUs support DDR5-4800 or LPDDR5-6400 in dual-channel mode.
- L1 cache: 64 KB (32 KB data + 32 KB instruction) per core.
- L2 cache: 512 KB per core.
- All the CPUs support 16 PCIe 4.0 lanes.
- Native USB 40Gbps (USB4) Ports: 2
- Native USB 10Gbps (USB 3.2 Gen 2 operation mode) Ports: 2
- Includes integrated RDNA 2 GPU.
- Fabrication process: TSMC N6 FinFET.

Branding and model		CPU					GPU				TDP	Release date
Branding and model		Cores (threads)	Clock (GHz)		L3 cache (total)	Core config (Note: Core Complexes (CCX) × cores per CCX)	Model	Clock (GHz)	Config (Note: Unified shaders : texture mapping units : render output units and compute units (CU))	Processing power (GFLOPS) (Note: Single precision performance is calculated from the base (or boost) core clock speed based on a FMA operation.)	TDP	Release date
Branding and model		Cores (threads)	Base	Boost	L3 cache (total)	Core config	Model	Clock (GHz)	Config	Processing power (GFLOPS)	TDP	Release date
Ryzen 9	6980HX	8 (16)	3.3	5.0	16 MB	1 × 8	680M	2.4	768:48:8; 12 CUs	3686	45 W	Jan 4, 2022
Ryzen 9	6980HS	8 (16)	3.3	5.0	16 MB	1 × 8	680M	2.4	768:48:8; 12 CUs	3686	35 W	Jan 4, 2022
Ryzen 9	6900HX (Note: Model also available as PRO version (6650U, 6650H, 6650HS, 6850U, 6850H, 6850HS, 6950H, 6950HS), released on April 19, 2022.)	8 (16)	3.3	4.9	16 MB	1 × 8	680M	2.4	768:48:8; 12 CUs	3686	45 W	Jan 4, 2022
Ryzen 9	6900HS	8 (16)	3.3	4.9	16 MB	1 × 8	680M	2.4	768:48:8; 12 CUs	3686	35 W	Jan 4, 2022
Ryzen 7	6800H	8 (16)	3.2	4.7	16 MB	1 × 8	680M	2.2	768:48:8; 12 CUs	3379	45 W	Jan 4, 2022
Ryzen 7	6800HS	8 (16)	3.2	4.7	16 MB	1 × 8	680M	2.2	768:48:8; 12 CUs	3379	35 W	Jan 4, 2022
Ryzen 7	6800U	8 (16)	2.7	4.7	16 MB	1 × 8	680M	2.2	768:48:8; 12 CUs	3379	15–28 W	Jan 4, 2022
Ryzen 5	6600H	6 (12)	3.3	4.5	16 MB	1 × 6	660M	1.9	384:24:8; 6 CUs	1459	45 W	Jan 4, 2022
Ryzen 5	6600HS	6 (12)	3.3	4.5	16 MB	1 × 6	660M	1.9	384:24:8; 6 CUs	1459	35 W	Jan 4, 2022
Ryzen 5	6600U	6 (12)	2.9	4.5	16 MB	1 × 6	660M	1.9	384:24:8; 6 CUs	1459	15–28 W	Jan 4, 2022

==== "Phoenix" (2024) ====
- Fabrication 4 nm by TSMC
- Up to eight Zen 4 CPU cores
- Dual-channel DDR5 or LPDDR5x memory controller
- RDNA3 iGPU
- XDNA accelerator

==== "Dragon Range" (2023) ====
- Fabrication 5 nm (CCD) and 6 nm (cIOD) by TSMC
- Up to sixteen Zen 4 CPU cores
- Dual-channel DDR5 memory controller
- Basic RDNA2 iGPU

== Ultra-mobile APUs ==
=== Brazos: "Desna", "Ontario", "Zacate" (2011) ===
- Fabrication 40 nm by TSMC
- Socket FT1 (BGA-413)
- Based on the Bobcat microarchitecture
- L1 Cache: 32 KB Data per core and 32 KB Instructions per core
- MMX, SSE, SSE2, SSE3, SSSE3, SSE4a, ABM, NX bit, AMD64, AMD-V
- PowerNow!
- DirectX 11 integrated graphics with UVD 3.0
- Z-series denote Desna; C-series denote Ontario; and the E-series denotes Zacate
- 2.50 GT/s UMI (PCIe 1.0 ×4)

Model	Released	Fab	Step.	CPU					GPU					DDR3 Memory support	TDP (W)	Part number
Model	Released	Fab	Step.	Cores (threads)	Clock (GHz)	Turbo (GHz)	Cache (Note: AMD in its technical documentation uses KB, which it defines as Kilobyte and as equal to 1024 bytes, and MB, which it defines as Megabyte and as equal to 1024 KB.)		Model	Config	Clock (MHz)	Turbo (MHz)	GFLOPS (Note: Single-precision performance is calculated from the base (or boost) core clock speed based on a FMA operation.)	DDR3 Memory support	TDP (W)	Part number
Model	Released	Fab	Step.	Cores (threads)	Clock (GHz)	Turbo (GHz)	L1	L2	Model	Config	Clock (MHz)	Turbo (MHz)	GFLOPS	DDR3 Memory support	TDP (W)	Part number
Z-01	June 1, 2011	40 nm	B0	2 (2)	1.0	—N/a	32KB inst. 32KB data per core	2× 512KB	HD 6250	80:8:4	276	—N/a	44.1	1066	5.9	XMZ01AFVB22GV
C-30	January 4, 2011	40 nm	B0	1 (1)	1.2	—N/a	32KB inst. 32KB data per core	512KB	HD 6250	80:8:4	276	—N/a	44.1	1066	9	CMC30AFPB12GT
C-50	January 4, 2011	40 nm	B0	2 (2)	1.0	—N/a	32KB inst. 32KB data per core	2× 512KB	HD 6250	80:8:4	276	—N/a	44.1	1066	9	CMC50AFPB22GT
C-60	August 22, 2011	40 nm	C0	2 (2)	1.0	1.33	32KB inst. 32KB data per core	2× 512KB	HD 6290	80:8:4	276	400	44.1	1066	9	CMC60AFPB22GV
E-240	January 4, 2011	40 nm	B0	1 (1)	1.5	—N/a	32KB inst. 32KB data per core	512KB	HD 6310	80:8:4	500	—N/a	80	1066	18	EME240GBB12GT
E-300	August 22, 2011	40 nm	B0	2 (2)	1.3	—N/a	32KB inst. 32KB data per core	2× 512KB	HD 6310	80:8:4	488	—N/a	78	1066	18	EME300GBB22GV
E-350	January 4, 2011	40 nm	B0	2 (2)	1.6	—N/a	32KB inst. 32KB data per core	2× 512KB	HD 6310	80:8:4	492	—N/a	78.7	1066	18	EME350GBB22GT
E-450	August 22, 2011	40 nm	B0; C0	2 (2)	1.65	—N/a	32KB inst. 32KB data per core	2× 512KB	HD 6320	80:8:4	508	600	81.2	1333	18	EME450GBB22GV

=== Brazos 2.0: "Ontario", "Zacate" (2012) ===
- Fabrication 40 nm by TSMC
- Socket FT1 (BGA-413)
- Based on the Bobcat microarchitecture
- L1 Cache: 32 KB Data per core and 32 KB Instructions per core
- MMX, SSE, SSE2, SSE3, SSSE3, SSE4a, ABM, NX bit, AMD64, AMD-V
- PowerNow!
- DirectX 11 integrated graphics
- C-series denote Ontario; and the E-series denotes Zacate
- 2.50 GT/s UMI (PCIe 1.0 ×4)

Model	Released	Fab	Step.	CPU						GPU					DDR3 Memory support	TDP (W)	Part number
Model	Released	Fab	Step.	Cores (threads)	Clock (GHz)	Turbo (GHz)	Cache (Note: AMD in its technical documentation uses KB, which it defines as Kilobyte and as equal to 1024 bytes, and MB, which it defines as Megabyte and as equal to 1024 KB.)			Model	Config	Clock (MHz)	Turbo (MHz)	GFLOPS (Note: Single-precision performance is calculated from the base (or boost) core clock speed based on a FMA operation.)	DDR3 Memory support	TDP (W)	Part number
Model	Released	Fab	Step.	Cores (threads)	Clock (GHz)	Turbo (GHz)	L1	L2	L3	Model	Config	Clock (MHz)	Turbo (MHz)	GFLOPS	DDR3 Memory support	TDP (W)	Part number
C-70	September 15, 2012	40 nm	C0	2 (2)	1.0	1.33	32 KB inst. 32 KB data per core	2× 512KB	—N/a	HD 7290	80:8:4	276	400	44.1	1066	9	CMC70AFPB22GV
E1-1200	June 6, 2012	40 nm	C0	2 (2)	1.4	—N/a	32 KB inst. 32 KB data per core	2× 512KB	—N/a	HD 7310	80:8:4	500	—N/a	80	1066	18	EM1200GBB22GV
E1-1500	January 7, 2013	40 nm	C0	2 (2)	1.48	—N/a	32 KB inst. 32 KB data per core	2× 512KB	—N/a	HD 7310	80:8:4	529	—N/a	84.6	1066	18	
E2-1800	June 6, 2012	40 nm	C0	2 (2)	1.7	—N/a	32 KB inst. 32 KB data per core	2× 512KB	—N/a	HD 7340	80:8:4	523	680	83.6	1333	18	EM1800GBB22GV
E2-2000	January 7, 2013	40 nm	C0	2 (2)	1.75	—N/a	32 KB inst. 32 KB data per core	2× 512KB	—N/a	HD 7340	80:8:4	538	700	86	1333	18	

=== Brazos-T: "Hondo" (2012) ===
- Fabrication 40 nm by TSMC
- Socket FT1 (BGA-413)
- Based on the Bobcat microarchitecture
- L1 Cache: 32 KB Data per core and 32 KB Instructions per core
- Found in tablet computers
- MMX, SSE, SSE2, SSE3, SSSE3, SSE4a, ABM, NX bit, AMD64, AMD-V
- PowerNow!
- DirectX 11 integrated graphics
- 2.50 GT/s UMI (PCIe 1.0 ×4)

Model	Released	Fab	Step.	CPU				GPU				DDR3 Memory support	TDP (W)	Part number
Model	Released	Fab	Step.	Cores (threads)	Clock (GHz)	Cache (Note: AMD in its technical documentation uses KB, which it defines as "kilobyte" and as equal to 1024 B (i.e., 1 KiB), and MB, which it defines as "megabyte" and as equal to 1024 KB (1 MiB).)		Model	Config	Clock (MHz)	GFLOPS (Note: Single-precision performance is calculated from the base (or boost) core clock speed based on a FMA operation.)	DDR3 Memory support	TDP (W)	Part number
Model	Released	Fab	Step.	Cores (threads)	Clock (GHz)	L1	L2	Model	Config	Clock (MHz)	GFLOPS	DDR3 Memory support	TDP (W)	Part number
Z-60	October 9, 2012	40 nm	C0	2 (2)	1.0	32KB inst. 32KB data per core	2× 512 KB	HD 6250	80:8:4	276	44.1	1066	4.5	XMZ60AFVB22GV

=== "Kabini", "Temash" (2013) ===
- Fabrication 28 nm by TSMC
- Socket FT3 (BGA)
- 2 to 4 CPU Cores (Jaguar (microarchitecture))
- L1 Cache: 32 KB Data per core and 32 KB Instructions per core
- MMX, SSE, SSE2, SSE3, SSSE3, SSE4a, SSE4.1, SSE4.2, AVX, F16C, CLMUL, AES, MOVBE (Move Big-Endian instruction), XSAVE/XSAVEOPT, ABM, BMI1, AMD-V support
- Turbo Dock Technology, C6 and CC6 low power states
- GPU based on Graphics Core Next (GCN)
- AMD Eyefinity multi-monitor for up to two displays

==== Temash, Elite Mobility APU ====
Model	Released	Fab	Step.	CPU					GPU				DDR3L Memory support	TDP (W)	Part number
Model	Released	Fab	Step.	Cores (threads)	Clock (GHz)	Turbo (GHz)	Cache (Note: AMD in its technical documentation uses KB, which it defines as Kilobyte and as equal to 1024 bytes, and MB, which it defines as Megabyte and as equal to 1024 KB.)		Model	Config	Clock (MHz)	Turbo (MHz)	DDR3L Memory support	TDP (W)	Part number
Model	Released	Fab	Step.	Cores (threads)	Clock (GHz)	Turbo (GHz)	L1	L2 (MB)	Model	Config	Clock (MHz)	Turbo (MHz)	DDR3L Memory support	TDP (W)	Part number
A4-1200	May 23, 2013	28 nm	KB-A1	2 (2)	1.0	—N/a	32 KB inst. 32 KB data per core	1	HD 8180	128:8:4; 2 CU	225	—N/a	1066	4	AT1200IFJ23HM
A4-1250	May 23, 2013	28 nm	KB-A1	2 (2)	1.0	—N/a	32 KB inst. 32 KB data per core	1	HD 8210	128:8:4; 2 CU	300	—N/a	1333	8	AT1250IDJ23HM
A4-1350	May 23, 2013	28 nm	KB-A1	4 (4)	1.0	—N/a	32 KB inst. 32 KB data per core	2	HD 8210	128:8:4; 2 CU	300	—N/a	1066	8	AT1350IDJ44HM
A6-1450	May 23, 2013	28 nm	KB-A1	4 (4)	1.0	1.4	32 KB inst. 32 KB data per core	2	HD 8250	128:8:4; 2 CU	300	400	1066	8	AT1450IDJ44HM

==== Kabini, Mainstream APU ====
Model	Released	Fab	Step.	CPU					GPU			DDR3L Memory support	TDP (W)	Part number
Model	Released	Fab	Step.	Cores (threads)	Clock (GHz)	Cache (Note: AMD in its technical documentation uses KB, which it defines as Kilobyte and as equal to 1024 bytes, and MB, which it defines as Megabyte and as equal to 1024 KB.)			Model	Config	Clock (MHz)	DDR3L Memory support	TDP (W)	Part number
Model	Released	Fab	Step.	Cores (threads)	Clock (GHz)	L1	L2 (MB)	L3	Model	Config	Clock (MHz)	DDR3L Memory support	TDP (W)	Part number
E1-2100	May 2013	28 nm	KB-A1	2 (2)	1.0	32KB inst. 32KB data per core	1	—N/a	HD 8210	128:8:4; 2 CU	300	1333	9	EM2100ICJ23HM
E1-2200	Feb 2014	28 nm	KB-A1	2 (2)	1.05	32KB inst. 32KB data per core	1	—N/a	HD 8210	128:8:4; 2 CU	300	1333	9	EM2200ICJ23HM
E1-2500	May 2013	28 nm	KB-A1	2 (2)	1.4	32KB inst. 32KB data per core	1	—N/a	HD 8240	128:8:4; 2 CU	400	1333	15	EM2500IBJ23HM
E2-3000	May 2013	28 nm	KB-A1	2 (2)	1.65	32KB inst. 32KB data per core	1	—N/a	HD 8280	128:8:4; 2 CU	450	1600	15	EM3000IBJ23HM
E2-3800	Feb 2014	28 nm	KB-A1	4	1.3	32KB inst. 32KB data per core	2	—N/a	HD 8280	128:8:4; 2 CU	450	1600	15	EM3800IBJ44HM
A4-5000	May 2013	28 nm	KB-A1	4	1.5	32KB inst. 32KB data per core	2	—N/a	HD 8330	128:8:4; 2 CU	497	1600	15	AM5000IBJ44HM
A4-5100	Feb 2014	28 nm	KB-A1	4	1.55	32KB inst. 32KB data per core	2	—N/a	HD 8330	128:8:4; 2 CU	497	1600	15	AM5100IBJ44HM
A6-5200	May 2013	28 nm	KB-A1	4	2.0	32KB inst. 32KB data per core	2	—N/a	HD 8400	128:8:4; 2 CU	600	1600	25	AM5200IAJ44HM
A4 Pro-3340B	Nov 2014	28 nm	KB-A1	4	2.2	32KB inst. 32KB data per core	2	—N/a	HD 8240	128:8:4; 2 CU	400	1600	25	AM334BIAJ44HM

=== "Beema", "Mullins" (2014) ===
- Fabrication 28 nm by GlobalFoundries
- Socket FT3b (BGA)
- CPU: 2 to 4 (Puma cores)
  - L1 Cache: 32 KB Data per core and 32 KB Instructions per core
- GPU based on Graphics Core Next (GCN)
- MMX, SSE, SSE2, SSE3, SSSE3, SSE4a, SSE4.1, SSE4.2, AVX, F16C, CLMUL, AES, MOVBE (Move Big-Endian instruction), XSAVE/XSAVEOPT, ABM, BMI1, AMD-V support
- Intelligent Turbo Boost
- Platform Security Processor, with an integrated ARM Cortex-A5 for TrustZone execution

==== Mullins, Tablet/2-in-1 APU ====
Model	Released	Fab	Step.	CPU						GPU				DDR3L Memory support	TDP (W)	Part number
Model	Released	Fab	Step.	Cores (threads)	Clock (GHz)	Turbo (GHz)	Cache (Note: AMD in its technical documentation uses KB, which it defines as Kilobyte and as equal to 1024 bytes, and MB, which it defines as Megabyte and as equal to 1024 KB.)			Model	Config	Clock (MHz)	Turbo (MHz)	DDR3L Memory support	TDP (W)	Part number
Model	Released	Fab	Step.	Cores (threads)	Clock (GHz)	Turbo (GHz)	L1	L2 (MB)	L3	Model	Config	Clock (MHz)	Turbo (MHz)	DDR3L Memory support	TDP (W)	Part number
E1 Micro-6200T	Q2 2014	28 nm	ML-A1	2 (2)	1.0	1.4	32 KB inst. 32 KB data per core	1	—N/a	R2	128:8:4; 2 CU	300	600	1066	3.95	EM620TIWJ23JB
A4 Micro-6400T	Q2 2014	28 nm	ML-A1	4 (4)	1.0	1.6	32 KB inst. 32 KB data per core	2	—N/a	R3	128:8:4; 2 CU	350	686	1333	4.5	AM640TIVJ44JB
A10 Micro-6700T	Q2 2014	28 nm	ML-A1	4 (4)	1.2	2.2	32 KB inst. 32 KB data per core	2	—N/a	R6	128:8:4; 2 CU	500	—N/a	1333	4.5	AM670TIVJ44JB

==== Beema, Notebook APU ====
Model	Released	Fab	Step.	CPU						GPU				DDR3 Memory support	TDP (W)	Part number
Model	Released	Fab	Step.	Cores (threads) [FPUs]	Clock (GHz)	Turbo (GHz)	Cache (Note: AMD in its technical documentation uses KB, which it defines as Kilobyte and as equal to 1024 bytes, and MB, which it defines as Megabyte and as equal to 1024 KB.)			Model	Config	Clock (MHz)	Turbo (MHz)	DDR3 Memory support	TDP (W)	Part number
Model	Released	Fab	Step.	Cores (threads) [FPUs]	Clock (GHz)	Turbo (GHz)	L1	L2 (MB)	L3	Model	Config	Clock (MHz)	Turbo (MHz)	DDR3 Memory support	TDP (W)	Part number
E1-6010	Q2 2014	28 nm	ML-A1	2 (2)	1.35	—N/a	32 KB inst. 32 KB data per core	1	—N/a	R2	128:8:4; 2 CU	300	600	(L)1333	10	EM6010IUJ23JB
E1-6015	Q2 2015	28 nm	ML-A1	2 (2)	1.4	—N/a	32 KB inst. 32 KB data per core	1	—N/a	R2	128:8:4; 2 CU	300	600	(L)1333	10	
E2-6110	Q2 2014	28 nm	ML-A1	4 (4)	1.5	—N/a	32 KB inst. 32 KB data per core	2	—N/a	R2	128:8:4; 2 CU	300	600	(L)1600	15	EM6110ITJ44JB
A4-6210	Q2 2014	28 nm	ML-A1	4 (4)	1.8	—N/a	32 KB inst. 32 KB data per core	2	—N/a	R3	128:8:4; 2 CU	350	686	(L)1600	15	AM6210ITJ44JB
A4-6250J	Q2 2014	28 nm	ML-A1	4 (4)	2.0	—N/a	32 KB inst. 32 KB data per core	2	—N/a	R3	128:8:4; 2 CU	350	686	(L)1600	25	
A6-6310	Q2 2014	28 nm	ML-A1	4 (4)	1.8	2.4	32 KB inst. 32 KB data per core	2	—N/a	R4	128:8:4; 2 CU	300	800	(L)1866	15	AM6310ITJ44JB
A8-6410	Q2 2014	28 nm	ML-A1	4 (4)	2.0	2.4	32 KB inst. 32 KB data per core	2	—N/a	R5	128:8:4; 2 CU	300	800	(L)1866	15	AM6410ITJ44JB

=== "Carrizo-L" (2015) ===
- Fabrication 28 nm by GlobalFoundries
- Socket FT3b (BGA), FP4 (μBGA)
- CPU: 2 to 4 (Puma+ cores)
  - L1 Cache: 32 KB Data per core and 32 KB Instructions per core
- GPU based on Graphics Core Next (GCN)
- MMX, SSE, SSE2, SSE3, SSSE3, SSE4a, SSE4.1, SSE4.2, AVX, F16C, CLMUL, AES, MOVBE (Move Big-Endian instruction), XSAVE/XSAVEOPT, ABM, BMI1, AMD-V support
- Intelligent Turbo Boost
- Platform Security Processor, with an integrated ARM Cortex-A5 for TrustZone execution
- All models except A8-7410 available in both laptop and all-in-one desktop versions

Model	Released	Fab	Step.	CPU					GPU				DDR3 Memory support	TDP (W)	Part number
Model	Released	Fab	Step.	Cores (threads) [FPUs]	Clock (GHz)	Turbo (GHz)	Cache (Note: AMD in its technical documentation uses KB, which it defines as Kilobyte and as equal to 1024 bytes, and MB, which it defines as Megabyte and as equal to 1024 KB.)		Model	Config	Clock	Turbo (MHz)	DDR3 Memory support	TDP (W)	Part number
Model	Released	Fab	Step.	Cores (threads) [FPUs]	Clock (GHz)	Turbo (GHz)	L1	L2 (MB)	Model	Config	Clock	Turbo (MHz)	DDR3 Memory support	TDP (W)	Part number
E1-7010	May 2015	28 nm	ML-A1	2	1.5	—N/a	32 KB inst. 32 KB data per core	1	R2	128:8:4; 2 CU		400	(L)1333	10	EM7010IUJ23JB; EM7010JCY23JB; EM7010JCY23JBD
E2-7110	May 2015	28 nm	ML-A1	4	1.8	—N/a	32 KB inst. 32 KB data per core	2	R2	128:8:4; 2 CU		600	(L)1600	12–25	EM7110ITJ44JB; EM7110JBY44JB; EM7110JBY44JBD
A4-7210	May 2015	28 nm	ML-A1	4	1.8	2.2	32 KB inst. 32 KB data per core	2	R3	128:8:4; 2 CU		686	(L)1600	12–25	AM7210ITJ44JB; AM7210JBY44JBD
A6-7310	May 2015	28 nm	ML-A1	4	2.0	2.4	32 KB inst. 32 KB data per core	2	R4	128:8:4; 2 CU		800	(L)1866	12–25	AM7310ITJ44JB; AM7310JBY44JB; AM7310JBY44JBD
A8-7410	May 2015	28 nm	ML-A1	4	2.2	2.5	32 KB inst. 32 KB data per core	2	R5	128:8:4; 2 CU		847	(L)1866	15	AM7410JBY44JB
A4 PRO-3350B	May 2016	28 nm	ML-A1	4	2.0	2.4	32 KB inst. 32 KB data per core	2	R4	128:8:4; 2 CU		800	1600	15	AM335BITJ44JB

=== "Stoney Ridge" (2016) ===
- Fabrication 28 nm by GlobalFoundries
- Socket FP4 / FT4
- 2 "Excavator+" x86 CPU cores
- L1 Cache: 32 KB Data per core and 96 KB Instructions per module
- Single-channel DDR4 memory controller
- MMX, SSE, SSE2, SSE3, SSSE3, SSE4.1, SSE4.2, SSE4a, AMD64, AMD-V, AES, CLMUL, AVX, AVX2, XOP, FMA3, FMA4, F16C, ABM, BMI1, BMI2, TBM, RDRAND, Turbo Core
- GPU based on Graphics Core Next 3rd Generation with VP9 decoding

Model number	Released	Fab	CPU					GPU				DDR4 Memory support	TDP (W)	Part number
Model number	Released	Fab	[Modules/FPUs] Cores/threads	Clock (GHz)	Turbo (GHz)	Cache (Note: AMD in its technical documentation uses KB, which it defines as Kilobyte and as equal to 1024 bytes, and MB, which it defines as Megabyte and as equal to 1024 KB.)		Model	Config	Clock (MHz)	GFLOPS (Note: Single-precision performance is calculated from the base (or boost) core clock speed based on a FMA operation.)	DDR4 Memory support	TDP (W)	Part number
Model number	Released	Fab	[Modules/FPUs] Cores/threads	Clock (GHz)	Turbo (GHz)	L1	L2 (MB)	Model	Config	Clock (MHz)	GFLOPS	DDR4 Memory support	TDP (W)	Part number
E2-9000e	November 2016	28 nm	[1]2	1.5	2.0	96 KB inst. per module 32 KB data per core	1	R2	128:8:4; 2 CU	600	153.6	1866	6	EM900EANN23AC
E2-9000	June 2016	28 nm	[1]2	1.8	2.2	96 KB inst. per module 32 KB data per core	1	R2	128:8:4; 2 CU	600	153.6	1866	10	EM9000AKN23AC
E2-9010	June 2016	28 nm	[1]2	2.0	2.2	96 KB inst. per module 32 KB data per core	1	R2	128:8:4; 2 CU	600	153.6	1866	10–15	EM9010AVY23AC
A4-9120	Q2 2017	28 nm	[1]2	2.2	2.5	96 KB inst. per module 32 KB data per core	1	R3	128:8:4; 2 CU	655	167.6	2133	10–15	AM9120AYN23AC
A4-9125	Q2 2018	28 nm	[1]2	2.3	2.6	96 KB inst. per module 32 KB data per core	1	R3	128:8:4; 2 CU	686	175.6	2133	10–15	AM9125AYN23AC
A4-9120C	January 6, 2019	28 nm	[1]2	1.6	2.4	96 KB inst. per module 32 KB data per core	1	R4	192:12:8; 3 CU	600	230.4	1866	6	AM912CANN23AC
A6-9200e	November 2016	28 nm	[1]2	1.8	2.7	96 KB inst. per module 32 KB data per core	1	R4	192:12:8; 3 CU	600	230.4	2133	6	AM920EANN23AC
A6-9200	November 2016	28 nm	[1]2	2.0	2.8	96 KB inst. per module 32 KB data per core	1	R4	192:12:8; 3 CU	600	230.4	2133	10	AM9200AKN23AC
A6-9210	June 2016	28 nm	[1]2	2.4	2.8	96 KB inst. per module 32 KB data per core	1	R4	192:12:8; 3 CU	600	230.4	2133	10–15	AM9210AVY23AC
A6-9220	Q2 2017	28 nm	[1]2	2.5	2.9	96 KB inst. per module 32 KB data per core	1	R4	192:12:8; 3 CU	655	251.5	2133	10–15	AM9220AYN23AC
A6-9225	Q2 2018	28 nm	[1]2	2.6	3.0	96 KB inst. per module 32 KB data per core	1	R4	192:12:8; 3 CU	686	263.4	2133	10–15	AM9225AYN23AC
A6-9220C	January 6, 2019	28 nm	[1]2	1.8	2.7	96 KB inst. per module 32 KB data per core	1	R5	192:12:8; 3 CU	720	276.4	1866	6	AM922CANN23AC
A9-9400	November 2016	28 nm	[1]2	2.4	3.2	96 KB inst. per module 32 KB data per core	1	R5	192:12:8; 3 CU	800	307.2	2133	10	AM9400AKN23AC
A9-9410	June 2016	28 nm	[1]2	2.9	3.5	96 KB inst. per module 32 KB data per core	1	R5	192:12:8; 3 CU	800	307.2	2133	10–25	AM9410AFY23AC
A9-9420	Q2 2017	28 nm	[1]2	3.0	3.6	96 KB inst. per module 32 KB data per core	1	R5	192:12:8; 3 CU	847	325.2	2133	10–25	AM9420AYN23AC
A9-9425	Q2 2018	28 nm	[1]2	3.1	3.7	96 KB inst. per module 32 KB data per core	1	R5	192:12:8; 3 CU	900	345.6	2133	10–25	AM9425AYN23AC
A9-9430	Q2 2017	28 nm	[1]2	3.2	3.5	96 KB inst. per module 32 KB data per core	1	R5	192:12:8; 3 CU	847	325.2	2400	25	AD9430AJN23AC
Pro A4-4350B	Q1 2018	28 nm	[1]2	2.5	2.9	96 KB inst. per module 32 KB data per core	1	R5	192:12:8; 3 CU	655	251.5	2133	15	
Pro A4-5350B	Q1 2020	28 nm	[1]2	3.0	3.6	96 KB inst. per module 32 KB data per core	1	R5	192:12:8; 3 CU	847	325.2	2133	15	
Pro A6-7350B	Q1 2018	28 nm	[1]2	3.0	3.6	96 KB inst. per module 32 KB data per core	1	R5	192:12:8; 3 CU	847	325.2	2133	15	
Pro A6-8350B	Q1 2020	28 nm	[1]2	3.1	3.7	96 KB inst. per module 32 KB data per core	1	R5	192:12:8; 3 CU	900	345.6	2133	15	

=== "Dalí" (2020) ===
- Fabrication 14 nm by GlobalFoundries
- Socket FP5
- Two Zen CPU cores
- Over 30% die size reduction over predecessor (Raven Ridge)
- MMX, SSE, SSE2, SSE3, SSSE3, SSE4.1, SSE4.2, SSE4a, AMD64, AMD-V, AES, CLMUL, AVX, AVX2, FMA3, F16C, ABM, BMI1, BMI2, RDRAND, Turbo Core
- Dual-channel RAM

Model	Release date	Fab	CPU						GPU				Socket	PCIe lanes	Memory support	TDP	Part number
Model	Release date	Fab	Cores (threads)	Clock rate (GHz)		Cache			Model	Config (Note: Unified shaders : Texture mapping units : Render output units and Compute units (CU))	Clock (GHz)	Processing power (GFLOPS) (Note: Single precision performance is calculated from the base (or boost) core clock speed based on a FMA operation.)	Socket	PCIe lanes	Memory support	TDP	Part number
Model	Release date	Fab	Cores (threads)	Base	Boost	L1	L2	L3	Model	Config	Clock (GHz)	Processing power (GFLOPS)	Socket	PCIe lanes	Memory support	TDP	Part number
AMD 3020e	Jan 6, 2020	14 nm	2 (2)	1.2	2.6	64 KB inst. 32 KB data per core	512 KB per core	4 MB	Radeon; Graphics (Vega)	192:12:4; 3 CU	1.0	384	FP5	12 (8+4)	DDR4-2400 dual-channel	6 W	YM3020C7T2OFG
Athlon PRO 3045B	Q1 2021	14 nm	2 (2)	2.3	3.2	64 KB inst. 32 KB data per core	512 KB per core	4 MB	Radeon; Graphics (Vega)	128:8:4; 2 CU	1.1	281.6	FP5	12 (8+4)	DDR4-2400 dual-channel	15 W	YM3045C4T2OFG
Athlon Silver 3050U	Jan 6, 2020	14 nm	2 (2)	2.3	3.2	64 KB inst. 32 KB data per core	512 KB per core	4 MB	Radeon; Graphics (Vega)	128:8:4; 2 CU	1.1	281.6	FP5	12 (8+4)	DDR4-2400 dual-channel	15 W	YM3050C4T2OFG
Athlon Silver 3050C	Sep 22, 2020	14 nm	2 (2)	2.3	3.2	64 KB inst. 32 KB data per core	512 KB per core	4 MB	Radeon; Graphics (Vega)	128:8:4; 2 CU	1.1	281.6	FP5	12 (8+4)	DDR4-2400 dual-channel	15 W	YM305CC4T2OFG
Athlon Silver 3050e	Jan 6, 2020	14 nm	2 (4)	1.4	2.8	64 KB inst. 32 KB data per core	512 KB per core	4 MB	Radeon; Graphics (Vega)	192:12:4; 3 CU	1.0	384	FP5	12 (8+4)	DDR4-2400 dual-channel	6 W	YM3050C7T2OFG
Athlon PRO 3145B	Q1 2021	14 nm	2 (4)	2.4	3.3	64 KB inst. 32 KB data per core	512 KB per core	4 MB	Radeon; Graphics (Vega)	192:12:4; 3 CU	1.0	384	FP5	12 (8+4)	DDR4-2400 dual-channel	15 W	YM3145C4T2OFG
Athlon Gold 3150U	Jan 6, 2020	14 nm	2 (4)	2.4	3.3	64 KB inst. 32 KB data per core	512 KB per core	4 MB	Radeon; Graphics (Vega)	192:12:4; 3 CU	1.0	384	FP5	12 (8+4)	DDR4-2400 dual-channel	15 W	YM3150C4T2OFG
Athlon Gold 3150C	Sep 22, 2020	14 nm	2 (4)	2.4	3.3	64 KB inst. 32 KB data per core	512 KB per core	4 MB	Radeon; Graphics (Vega)	192:12:4; 3 CU	1.0	384	FP5	12 (8+4)	DDR4-2400 dual-channel	15 W	YM315CC4T2OFG
Ryzen 3 3250U	Jan 6, 2020	14 nm	2 (4)	2.6	3.5	64 KB inst. 32 KB data per core	512 KB per core	4 MB	Radeon; Graphics (Vega)	192:12:4; 3 CU	1.2	460.8	FP5	12 (8+4)	DDR4-2400 dual-channel	15 W	YM3250C4T2OFG
Ryzen 3 3250C	Sep 22, 2020	14 nm	2 (4)	2.6	3.5	64 KB inst. 32 KB data per core	512 KB per core	4 MB	Radeon; Graphics (Vega)	192:12:4; 3 CU	1.2	460.8	FP5	12 (8+4)	DDR4-2400 dual-channel	15 W	YM325CC4T2OFG

=== "Pollock" (2020) ===
- Fabrication 14 nm by GlobalFoundries
- Socket FT5
- Two Zen CPU cores
- MMX, SSE, SSE2, SSE3, SSSE3, SSE4.1, SSE4.2, SSE4a, AMD64, AMD-V, AES, CLMUL, AVX, AVX2, FMA3, F16C, ABM, BMI1, BMI2, RDRAND, Turbo Core
- Single-channel RAM

Model	Release date	Fab	CPU						GPU				Socket	PCIe lanes	Memory support	TDP	Part number
Model	Release date	Fab	Cores (threads)	Clock rate (GHz)		Cache			Model	Config (Note: Unified shaders : Texture mapping units : Render output units and Compute units (CU))	Clock (GHz)	Processing power (GFLOPS) (Note: Single precision performance is calculated from the base (or boost) core clock speed based on a FMA operation.)	Socket	PCIe lanes	Memory support	TDP	Part number
Model	Release date	Fab	Cores (threads)	Base	Boost	L1	L2	L3	Model	Config	Clock (GHz)	Processing power (GFLOPS)	Socket	PCIe lanes	Memory support	TDP	Part number
AMD 3015e	Jul 6, 2020	14 nm	2 (4)	1.2	2.3	64 KB inst. 32 KB data per core	512 KB per core	4 MB	Radeon; Graphics (Vega)	192:12:4; 3 CU	0.6	230.4	FT5	12 (8+4)	DDR4-1600 single-channel	6 W	AM3015BRP2OFJ
AMD 3015Ce	Apr 29, 2021	14 nm	2 (4)	1.2	2.3	64 KB inst. 32 KB data per core	512 KB per core	4 MB	Radeon; Graphics (Vega)	192:12:4; 3 CU	0.6	230.4	FT5	12 (8+4)	DDR4-1600 single-channel	6 W	AM301CBRP2OFJ

=== "Mendocino" (2022) ===
Common features:

- Socket: FT6
- All the CPUs support LPDDR5-5500 in dual-channel mode.
- L1 cache: 64 KB (32 KB data + 32 KB instruction) per core.
- L2 cache: 512 KB per core.
- All the CPUs support 4 PCIe 3.0 lanes.
- Includes integrated RDNA2 GPU.
- Fabrication process: TSMC 6 nm FinFET.

Branding and Model		CPU					GPU		TDP	Release date
Branding and Model		Cores (threads)	Clock rate (GHz)		L3 cache (total)	Core config (Note: Core Complexes (CCX) × cores per CCX)	Model	Clock	TDP	Release date
Branding and Model		Cores (threads)	Base	Boost	L3 cache (total)	Core config	Model	Clock	TDP	Release date
Athlon Gold	7220U (Note: Model also available as Chromebook optimized version as 7220C and 7120C released on May 23, 2023)	2 (4)	2.4	3.7	4 MB	1 x 2	610M; 2 CU	1900 MHz	8–15 W	Sep 20, 2022
Athlon Silver	7120U	2 (2)	2.4	3.5	2 MB	1 x 2	610M; 2 CU	1900 MHz	8–15 W	Sep 20, 2022

== Embedded APUs ==
=== G-Series ===
==== Brazos: "Ontario" and "Zacate" (2011) ====
- Fabrication 40 nm
- Socket FT1 (BGA-413)
- CPU microarchitecture: Bobcat
- L1 Cache: 32 KB Data per core and 32 KB Instructions per core
- MMX, SSE, SSE2, SSE3, SSSE3, SSE4a, ABM, NX bit, AMD64, AMD-V
- GPU microarchitecture: TeraScale 2 (VLIW5) "Evergreen"
- Memory support: single-channel, support up to two DIMMs of DDR3-1333 or DDR3L-1066
- 5 GT/s UMI

Model	Released	Fab	Step.	CPU				GPU				DDR3 Memory support	TDP (W)	Part number
Model	Released	Fab	Step.	Cores (threads)	Clock (GHz)	Cache (Note: AMD in its technical documentation uses KB, which it defines as Kilobyte and as equal to 1024 bytes, and MB, which it defines as Megabyte and as equal to 1024 KB.)		Model	Config	Clock (MHz)	Processing power (GFLOPS) (Note: Single-precision performance is calculated from the base (or boost) core clock speed based on a FMA operation.)	DDR3 Memory support	TDP (W)	Part number
Model	Released	Fab	Step.	Cores (threads)	Clock (GHz)	L1	L2	Model	Config	Clock (MHz)	Processing power (GFLOPS)	DDR3 Memory support	TDP (W)	Part number
G-Series T24L	March 1, 2011; May 23, 2011	40 nm	B0	1 (1)	0.8; 1.0	32 KB inst. 32 KB data per core	512 KB	—N/a				1066	5	GET24LFPB12GTE; GET24LFQB12GVE
G-Series T30L	March 1, 2011; May 23, 2011	40 nm	B0	1 (1)	1.4	32 KB inst. 32 KB data per core	512 KB	—N/a				1066	18	GET30LGBB12GTE; GET30LGBB12GVE
G-Series T48L	March 1, 2011; May 23, 2011	40 nm	B0	2 (2)	1.4	32 KB inst. 32 KB data per core	2 × 512 KB	—N/a				1066	18	GET48LGBB22GTE; GET48LGBB22GVE
G-Series T16R	June 25, 2012	40 nm	B0	1 (1)	0.615	32 KB inst. 32 KB data per core	512 KB	HD 6250	80:8:4	276	44.1	(L)1066	4.5	GET16RFWB12GVE
G-Series T40R	May 23, 2011	40 nm	B0	1 (1)	1.0	32 KB inst. 32 KB data per core	512 KB	HD 6250	80:8:4	280	44.8	1066	5.5	GET40RFQB12GVE
G-Series T40E	May 23, 2011	40 nm	B0	2 (2)	1.0	32 KB inst. 32 KB data per core	2 × 512 KB	HD 6250	80:8:4	280	44.8	1066	6.4	GET40EFQB22GVE
G-Series T40N	January 19, 2011; May 23, 2011	40 nm	B0	2 (2)	1.0	32 KB inst. 32 KB data per core	2 × 512 KB	HD 6250; HD 6290	80:8:4	280	44.8	1066	9	GET40NFPB22GTE; GET40NFPB22GVE
G-Series T40R	May 23, 2011	40 nm	B0	1 (1)	1.0	32 KB inst. 32 KB data per core	512 KB	HD 6250	80:8:4	280	44.8	1066	5.5	GET40RFSB12GVE
G-Series T44R	January 19, 2011; May 23, 2011	40 nm	B0	1 (1)	1.2	32 KB inst. 32 KB data per core	512 KB	HD 6250	80:8:4	280	44.8	1066	9	GET44RFPB12GTE; GET44RFPB12GVE
G-Series T48E	June 25, 2012	40 nm	B0	2 (2)	1.4	32 KB inst. 32 KB data per core	2 × 512 KB	HD 6250	80:8:4	280	44.8	1066	18	GET48EGBB22GVE
G-Series T48N	January 19, 2011; May 23, 2011	40 nm	B0	2 (2)	1.4	32 KB inst. 32 KB data per core	2 × 512 KB	HD 6310	80:8:4	500; 520	80; 83.2	1066	18	GET48NGBB22GTE; GET48NGBB22GVE
G-Series T52R	January 19, 2011; May 23, 2011	40 nm	B0	1 (1)	1.5	32 KB inst. 32 KB data per core	512 KB	HD 6310	80:8:4	500	80	1066; 1333	18	GET52RGBB12GTE; GET52RGBB12GVE
G-Series T56E	June 25, 2012	40 nm	B0	2 (2)	1.65	32 KB inst. 32 KB data per core	2 × 512 KB	HD 6250	80:8:4	275	44	1333	18	GET56EGBB22GVE
G-Series T56N	January 19, 2011; May 23, 2011	40 nm	B0	2 (2)	1.6; 1.65	32 KB inst. 32 KB data per core	2 × 512 KB	HD 6310; HD 6320	80:8:4	500	80	1066; 1333	18	GET56NGBB22GTE; GET56NGBB22GVE

==== "Kabini" (2013, SoC) ====
- Fabrication 28 nm
- Socket FT3 (769-BGA)
- CPU microarchitecture: Jaguar
- L1 Cache: 32 KB Data per core and 32 KB Instructions per core
- MMX, SSE, SSE2, SSE3, SSSE3, SSE4a, SSE4.1, SSE4.2, AVX, F16C, CLMUL, AES, MOVBE (Move Big-Endian instruction), XSAVE/XSAVEOPT, ABM, BMI1, AMD-V support. No support for FMA (Fused Multiply-Accumulate). Trusted Platform Module (TPM) 1.2 support
- GPU microarchitecture: Graphics Core Next (GCN) with Unified Video Decoder 3 (H.264, VC-1, MPEG2, etc.)
- Single channel DDR3-1600, 1.25 and 1.35 V voltage level support, support for ECC memory
- Integrates Controller Hub functional block, HD audio, 2 SATA channels, USB 2.0 and USB 3.0 (except GX-210JA)

Model	Released	Fab	Step.	CPU				GPU				DDR3 Memory support	TDP (W)	Junction temperature (°C)	Part number
Model	Released	Fab	Step.	Cores (threads)	Clock (GHz)	Cache (Note: AMD in its technical documentation uses KB, which it defines as Kilobyte and as equal to 1024 bytes, and MB, which it defines as Megabyte and as equal to 1024 KB.)		Model	Config	Clock (MHz)	Processing power (GFLOPS) (Note: Single-precision performance is calculated from the base (or boost) core clock speed based on a FMA operation.)	DDR3 Memory support	TDP (W)	Junction temperature (°C)	Part number
Model	Released	Fab	Step.	Cores (threads)	Clock (GHz)	L1	L2 (MB)	Model	Config	Clock (MHz)	Processing power (GFLOPS)	DDR3 Memory support	TDP (W)	Junction temperature (°C)	Part number
GX-210UA	Unknown	28 nm	B0	2 (2)	1.0	32 KB inst. 32 KB data per core	1	—N/a				1333	8.5	0-90	GE210UIGJ23HM
GX-210JA	July 30, 2013	28 nm	B0	2 (2)	1.0	32 KB inst. 32 KB data per core	1	HD 8180E	128:8:4; 2 CU	225	57.6	1066	6	0-90	GE210JIHJ23HM
GX-209HA	Unknown	28 nm	B0	2 (2)	1.0	32 KB inst. 32 KB data per core	1	HD 8400E	128:8:4; 2 CU	600	153.6	1066	9	-40-105	GE209HISJ23HM
GX-210HA	June 1, 2013	28 nm	B0	2 (2)	1.0	32 KB inst. 32 KB data per core	1	HD 8210E	128:8:4; 2 CU	300	76.8	1333	9	0-90	GE210HICJ23HM
GX-217GA	June 1, 2013	28 nm	B0	2 (2)	1.65	32 KB inst. 32 KB data per core	1	HD 8280E	128:8:4; 2 CU	450	115.2	1600	15	0-90	GE217GIBJ23HM
GX-411GA	Unknown	28 nm	B0	4 (4)	1.1	32 KB inst. 32 KB data per core	2	HD 8210E	128:8:4; 2 CU	300	76.8	1066	15	-40-105	GE411GIRJ44HM
GX-415GA	June 1, 2013	28 nm	B0	4 (4)	1.5	32 KB inst. 32 KB data per core	2	HD 8330E	128:8:4; 2 CU	500	128	1600	15	0-90	GE415GIBJ44HM
GX-416RA	June 1, 2013	28 nm	B0	4 (4)	1.6	32 KB inst. 32 KB data per core	2	—N/a				1600	15	0-90	GE416RIBJ44HM
GX-420CA	June 1, 2013	28 nm	B0	4 (4)	2.0	32 KB inst. 32 KB data per core	2	HD 8400E	128:8:4; 2 CU	600	153.6	1600	25	0-90	GE420CIAJ44HM

==== "Steppe Eagle" (2014, SoC) ====
- Fabrication 28 nm
- Socket FT3b (769-BGA)
- CPU microarchitecture: Puma
- L1 Cache: 32 KB Data per core and 32 KB Instructions per core
- MMX, SSE, SSE2, SSE3, SSSE3, SSE4a, SSE4.1, SSE4.2, AVX, F16C, CLMUL, AES, MOVBE (Move Big-Endian instruction), XSAVE/XSAVEOPT, ABM, BMI1, AMD-V support

Model	Released	Fab	Step.	CPU				GPU				DDR3 Memory support	TDP (W)	Junction temperature (°C)	Part number
Model	Released	Fab	Step.	Cores (threads) [FPUs]	Clock (GHz)	Cache (Note: AMD in its technical documentation uses KB, which it defines as Kilobyte and as equal to 1024 bytes, and MB, which it defines as Megabyte and as equal to 1024 KB.)		Model	Config	Clock (MHz)	Processing power (GFLOPS) (Note: Single-precision performance is calculated from the base (or boost) core clock speed based on a FMA operation.)	DDR3 Memory support	TDP (W)	Junction temperature (°C)	Part number
Model	Released	Fab	Step.	Cores (threads) [FPUs]	Clock (GHz)	L1	L2 (MB)	Model	Config	Clock (MHz)	Processing power (GFLOPS)	DDR3 Memory support	TDP (W)	Junction temperature (°C)	Part number
GX-210JC	June 4, 2014	28 nm	ML-A1	2 (2) [1]	1.0	32 KB inst. 32 KB data per core	1	R1E	128:8:4; 2 CU	267	68.3	1600	6	-40-105	GE210JIZJ23JB
GX-212JC	June 4, 2014	28 nm	ML-A1	2 (2) [1]	1.2	32 KB inst. 32 KB data per core	1	R2E	128:8:4; 2 CU	300	76.8	1333	6	0-90	GE212JIYJ23JB
GX-216HC	June 4, 2014	28 nm	ML-A1	2 (2) [1]	1.6	32 KB inst. 32 KB data per core	1	R4E	128:8:4; 2 CU	300	76.8	1066	10	-40-105	GE216HHBJ23JB
GX-222GC	June 4, 2014	28 nm	ML-A1	2 (2) [1]	2.2	32 KB inst. 32 KB data per core	1	R5E	128:8:4; 2 CU	655	167.6	1600	15	0-90	GE222GITJ23JB
GX-412HC	June 4, 2014	28 nm	ML-A1	4 (4) [2]	1.2	32 KB inst. 32 KB data per core	2	R3E	128:8:4; 2 CU	300	76.8	1333	7	0-90	GE412HIYJ44JB
GX-424CC	June 4, 2014	28 nm	ML-A1	4 (4) [2]	2.4	32 KB inst. 32 KB data per core	2	R5E	128:8:4; 2 CU	497	127.2	1866	25	0-90	GE424CIXJ44JB

==== "Crowned Eagle" (2014, SoC) ====
- Fabrication 28 nm
- Socket FT3b (769-BGA)
- CPU microarchitecture: Puma
- L1 Cache: 32 KB Data per core and 32 KB Instructions per core
- MMX, SSE, SSE2, SSE3, SSSE3, SSE4a, SSE4.1, SSE4.2, AVX, F16C, CLMUL, AES, MOVBE (Move Big-Endian instruction), XSAVE/XSAVEOPT, ABM, BMI1, AMD-V support
- no GPU

Model	Released	Fab	CPU				GPU	DDR3 Memory support	TDP (W)	Junction temperature (°C)	Part number
Model	Released	Fab	Cores (threads) [FPUs]	Clock (GHz)	Cache (Note: AMD in its technical documentation uses KB, which it defines as Kilobyte and as equal to 1024 bytes, and MB, which it defines as Megabyte and as equal to 1024 KB.)		GPU	DDR3 Memory support	TDP (W)	Junction temperature (°C)	Part number
Model	Released	Fab	Cores (threads) [FPUs]	Clock (GHz)	L1	L2 (MB)	GPU	DDR3 Memory support	TDP (W)	Junction temperature (°C)	Part number
GX-224PC	June 4, 2014	28 nm	2 (2) [1]	2.4	32 KB inst. 32 KB data per core	1	—N/a	1866	25	0-90	GE224PIXJ23JB
GX-410VC	June 4, 2014	28 nm	4 (4) [2]	1.0	32 KB inst. 32 KB data per core	2	—N/a	1066	7	-40-105	GE410VIZJ44JB
GX-412TC	June 4, 2014	28 nm	4 (4) [2]	1.2	32 KB inst. 32 KB data per core	2	—N/a	1600	6	0-90	GE412TIYJ44JB
GX-420MC	June 4, 2014	28 nm	4 (4) [2]	2.0	32 KB inst. 32 KB data per core	2	—N/a	1600	17.5	0-90	GE420MIXJ44JB

==== LX-Family (2016, SoC) ====
- Fabrication 28 nm
- Socket FT3b (769-BGA)
- 2 Puma x86 cores with 1MB shared L2 cache
- L1 Cache: 32 KB Data per core and 32 KB Instructions per core
- MMX, SSE, SSE2, SSE3, SSSE3, SSE4a, SSE4.1, SSE4.2, AVX, F16C, CLMUL, AES, MOVBE (Move Big-Endian instruction), XSAVE/XSAVEOPT, ABM, BMI1, AMD-V support
- GPU microarchitecture: Graphics Core Next (GCN) (1CU) with support for DirectX 11.2
- Single channel 64-bit DDR3 memory with ECC
- Integrated Controller Hub supports: PCIe® 2.0 4×1, 2 USB3 + 4 USB2 ports, 2 SATA 2.0/3.0 ports

Model	Released	Fab	Step.	CPU				GPU				DDR3 Memory support	TDP (W)	Part number
Model	Released	Fab	Step.	Cores (threads) [FPUs]	Clock (GHz)	Cache (Note: AMD in its technical documentation uses KB, which it defines as Kilobyte and as equal to 1024 bytes, and MB, which it defines as Megabyte and as equal to 1024 KB.)		Model	Config	Clock (MHz)	Processing power (GFLOPS) (Note: Single-precision performance is calculated from the base (or boost) core clock speed based on a FMA operation.)	DDR3 Memory support	TDP (W)	Part number
Model	Released	Fab	Step.	Cores (threads) [FPUs]	Clock (GHz)	L1	L2 (MB)	Model	Config	Clock (MHz)	Processing power (GFLOPS)	DDR3 Memory support	TDP (W)	Part number
GX-208JL	February 23, 2016	28 nm	ML-A1	2	0.8	32 KB inst. 32 KB data per core	1	R1E	64:4:1; 1 CU	267	34.1	1333	6	GE208JIVJ23JB
GX-210HL	2017	28 nm	ML-A1	2	1.0	32 KB inst. 32 KB data per core	1	R1E	64:4:1; 1 CU	267	34.1	1066	7	GE208HIZJ23JB
GX-210JL	February 23, 2016	28 nm	ML-A1	2	1.0	32 KB inst. 32 KB data per core	1	R1E	64:4:1; 1 CU	267	34.1	1333	6	GE210JIVJ23JB
GX-210KL	2017	28 nm	ML-A1	2	1.0	32 KB inst. 32 KB data per core	1	R1E	64:4:1; 1 CU	267	34.1	1333	4.5	GE210KIVJ23JB
GX-215GL	February 23, 2016	28 nm	ML-A1	2	1.5	32 KB inst. 32 KB data per core	1	R1E	64:4:1; 1 CU	497	63.6	1600	15	GE215GITJ23JB
GX-218GL	February 23, 2016	28 nm	ML-A1	2	1.8	32 KB inst. 32 KB data per core	1	R1E	64:4:1; 1 CU	497	63.6	1600	15	GE218GITJ23JB

==== I-Family: "Brown Falcon" (2016, SoC) ====
- Fabrication 28 nm
- Socket FP4
- 2 or 4 Excavator x86 cores with 1MB shared L2 cache
- L1 Cache: 32 KB Data per core and 96 KB Instructions per module
- MMX, SSE, SSE2, SSE3, SSSE3, SSE4.1, SSE4.2, SSE4a, AMD64, AMD-V, AES, CLMUL, AVX, AVX2, XOP, FMA3, FMA4, F16C, ABM, BMI1, BMI2, TBM, RDRAND
- GPU microarchitecture: Graphics Core Next (GCN) (up to 4 CUs) with support for DirectX 12
- Dual channel 64-bit DDR4 or DDR3 memory with ECC
- 4K × 2K H.265 decode capability and multi format encode and decode
- Integrated Controller Hub supports: PCIe 3.0 1×4, PCIe 2/3 4×1, 2 USB3 + 2 USB2 ports, 2 SATA 2.0/3.0 ports

Model	Released	Fab	CPU					GPU				Memory support	TDP (W)	Part number
Model	Released	Fab	[Modules/FPUs] Cores/threads	Clock (GHz)	Turbo (GHz)	Cache (Note: AMD in its technical documentation uses KB, which it defines as Kilobyte and as equal to 1024 bytes, and MB, which it defines as Megabyte and as equal to 1024 KB.)		Model	Config (Note: Unified shader processors (USPs): Texture mapping units (TMUs): Render output units (ROPs). 1 CU (Compute Unit) = 64 USPs: 4 TMUs : 1 ROPs)	Clock (MHz)	Processing power (GFLOPS) (Note: Single-precision performance is calculated from the base (or boost) core clock speed based on a FMA operation.)	Memory support	TDP (W)	Part number
Model	Released	Fab	[Modules/FPUs] Cores/threads	Clock (GHz)	Turbo (GHz)	L1	L2 (MB)	Model	Config	Clock (MHz)	Processing power (GFLOPS)	Memory support	TDP (W)	Part number
GX-217GI	February 23, 2016	28 nm	[1] 2	1.7	2.0	96 KB inst. per module 32 KB data per core	1	R6E	256:16:4; 4 CU	758	388	DDR3/DDR4-1600	15	GE217GAAY23KA
GX-420GI	2016	28 nm	[2] 4	2.0	2.2	96 KB inst. per module 32 KB data per core	2	R6E R7E	256:16:4; 4 CU 384:24:4; 6 CU	758 626	388 480.7	DDR4-1866	16.1	GE420GAAY43KA

==== J-Family: "Prairie Falcon" (2016, SoC) ====
- Fabrication 28 nm
- Socket FP4
- 2 "Excavator+" x86 cores with 1MB shared L2 cache
- L1 Cache: 32 KB Data per core and 96 KB Instructions per module
- MMX, SSE, SSE2, SSE3, SSSE3, SSE4.1, SSE4.2, SSE4a, AMD64, AMD-V, AES, CLMUL, AVX, AVX2, XOP, FMA3, FMA4, F16C, ABM, BMI1, BMI2, TBM, RDRAND
- GPU microarchitecture: Radeon R5E Graphics Core Next (GCN) (up to 3 CUs) with support for DirectX 12
- Single channel 64-bit DDR4 or DDR3 memory
- 4K × 2K H.265 decode capability with 10-bit compatibility and multi format encode and decode
- Integrated Controller Hub supports: PCIe 3.0 1×4, PCIe 2/3 4×1, 2 USB3 + 2 USB2 ports, 2 SATA 2.0/3.0 ports

Model	Released	Fab	CPU					GPU					Memory support	TDP (W)	Junction temperature (°C)	Part number
Model	Released	Fab	[Modules/FPUs] Cores/threads	Clock (GHz)	Turbo (GHz)	Cache (Note: AMD in its technical documentation uses KB, which it defines as Kilobyte and as equal to 1024 bytes, and MB, which it defines as Megabyte and as equal to 1024 KB.)		Model	Config	Clock (MHz)	Turbo	Processing power (GFLOPS) (Note: Single-precision performance is calculated from the base (or boost) core clock speed based on a FMA operation.)	Memory support	TDP (W)	Junction temperature (°C)	Part number
Model	Released	Fab	[Modules/FPUs] Cores/threads	Clock (GHz)	Turbo (GHz)	L1	L2 (MB)	Model	Config	Clock (MHz)	Turbo	Processing power (GFLOPS)	Memory support	TDP (W)	Junction temperature (°C)	Part number
GX-212JJ	2018	28 nm	[1] 2	1.2	1.6	96 KB inst. per module 32 KB data per core	1	R1E	64:4:1; 1 CU	600	—N/a	76.8	DDR3-1333; DDR4-1600	6– 10	0-90	GE212JAWY23AC
GX-215JJ	2017	28 nm	[1] 2	1.5	2.0	96 KB inst. per module 32 KB data per core	1	R2E	128:8:2; 2 CU	600	—N/a	153.6	DDR3-1600; DDR4-1866	6– 10	0-90	GE215JAWY23AC
GX-220IJ	2018	28 nm	[1] 2	2.0	2.2	96 KB inst. per module 32 KB data per core	1	R2E	128:8:2; 2 CU	600	—N/a	153.6	DDR3-1600; DDR4-1866	10– 15	0-90	GE220IAVY23AC
GX-224IJ	2017	28 nm	[1] 2	2.4	2.8	96 KB inst. per module 32 KB data per core	1	R4E	192:12:3; 3 CU	600	—N/a	230.4	DDR3-1866; DDR4-2133	10– 15	0-90	GE224IAVY23AC

=== R-Series ===
==== Comal: "Trinity" (2012) ====
- Fabrication 32 nm
- Socket FP2 (BGA-827), FS1r2
- CPU microarchitecture: Piledriver
- L1 Cache: 16 KB Data per core and 64 KB Instructions per module
- MMX, SSE, SSE2, SSE3, SSSE3, SSE4a, SSE4.1, SSE4.2, AMD64, AMD-V, AES, CLMUL, AVX, XOP, FMA3, FMA4, F16C, ABM, BMI1, TBM
- GPU microarchitecture: TeraScale 3 (VLIW4) "Northern Islands"
- Memory support: dual-channel 1.35 V DDR3L-1600 memory, in addition to regular 1.5 V DDR3
- 2.5 GT/s UMI
- Die size: 246 mm^{2}; Transistors: 1.303 billion
- OpenCL 1.1 and OpenGL 4.2 support

Model	Released	Fab	Step.	CPU					GPU					DDR3 Memory support	TDP (W)	Part number
Model	Released	Fab	Step.	[Modules/FPUs] Cores/threads	Clock (GHz)	Turbo (GHz)	Cache (Note: AMD in its technical documentation uses KB, which it defines as Kilobyte and as equal to 1024 bytes, and MB, which it defines as Megabyte and as equal to 1024 KB.)		Model	Config	Clock (MHz)	Turbo (MHz)	Processing power (GFLOPS) (Note: Single-precision performance is calculated from the base (or boost) core clock speed based on a FMA operation.)	DDR3 Memory support	TDP (W)	Part number
Model	Released	Fab	Step.	[Modules/FPUs] Cores/threads	Clock (GHz)	Turbo (GHz)	L1	L2 (MB)	Model	Config	Clock (MHz)	Turbo (MHz)	Processing power (GFLOPS)	DDR3 Memory support	TDP (W)	Part number
R-252F	May 21, 2012	32 nm	B0	[1] 2	1.9	2.4	64 KB inst. per module 16 KB data per core	1	HD 7400G	192:12:4; 3 CU	333	417	127.8	1333	17	RE252FSHE23HJE
R-260H	May 21, 2012	32 nm	B0	[1] 2	2.1	2.6	64 KB inst. per module 16 KB data per core	2?	HD 7500G	256:16:8; 4 CU	327	424	167.4	1333	17	RE260HSHE24HJE
R-268D	May 21, 2012	32 nm	B0	[1] 2	2.5	3.0	64 KB inst. per module 16 KB data per core	1	HD 7420G	192:12:4; 3 CU	470	640	180.4	1600	35	RE268DDEC23HJE
R-272F	May 21, 2012	32 nm	B0	[1] 2	2.7	3.2	64 KB inst. per module 16 KB data per core	1	HD 7520G	192:12:4; 3 CU	497	686	190.8	1600	35	RE272FDEC23HJE
R-452L	May 21, 2012	32 nm	B0	[2] 4	1.6	2.4	64 KB inst. per module 16 KB data per core	2 × 2 MB	HD 7600G	256:16:8; 4 CU	327	424	167.4	1600	19	RE452LSHE44HJE
R-460H	May 21, 2012	32 nm	B0	[2] 4	1.9	2.8	64 KB inst. per module 16 KB data per core	2 × 2 MB	HD 7640G	256:16:8; 4 CU	497	655	254.4	1600	35	RE460HDEC44HJE
R-460L	May 21, 2012	32 nm	B0	[2] 4	2.0	2.8	64 KB inst. per module 16 KB data per core	2 × 2 MB	HD 7620G	384:24:8; 6 CU	360	497	276.4	1333	25	RE460LSIE44HJE
R-464L	May 21, 2012	32 nm	B0	[2] 4	2.3	3.2	64 KB inst. per module 16 KB data per core	2 × 2 MB	HD 7660G	384:24:8; 6 CU	497	686	381.6	1600	35	RE464LDEC44HJE

==== "Bald Eagle" (2014) ====
- Fabrication 28 nm
- Socket FP3
- Up to 4 Steamroller x86 cores
- L1 Cache: 16 KB Data per core and 96 KB Instructions per module
- MMX, SSE, SSE2, SSE3, SSSE3, SSE4a, SSE4.1, SSE4.2, AMD64, AMD-V, AES, CLMUL, AVX, XOP, FMA3, FMA4, F16C, ABM, BMI1, TBM
- GPU microarchitecture: Graphics Core Next (GCN) (up to 8 CUs) with support for DirectX 11.1 and OpenGL 4.2
- Dual channel DDR3 memory with ECC
- Unified Video Decode (UVD) 4.2 and Video Coding Engine (VCE) 2.0

Model	Released	Fab	CPU					GPU					DDR3 Memory support	TDP (W)	Junction temperature (°C)	Part number
Model	Released	Fab	[Modules/FPUs] Cores/threads	Clock (GHz)	Turbo (GHz)	Cache (Note: AMD in its technical documentation uses KB, which it defines as Kilobyte and as equal to 1024 bytes, and MB, which it defines as Megabyte and as equal to 1024 KB.)		Model	Config	Clock (MHz)	Turbo (MHz)	Processing power (GFLOPS) (Note: Single-precision performance is calculated from the base (or boost) core clock speed based on a FMA operation.)	DDR3 Memory support	TDP (W)	Junction temperature (°C)	Part number
Model	Released	Fab	[Modules/FPUs] Cores/threads	Clock (GHz)	Turbo (GHz)	L1	L2 (MB)	Model	Config	Clock (MHz)	Turbo (MHz)	Processing power (GFLOPS)	DDR3 Memory support	TDP (W)	Junction temperature (°C)	Part number
RX-219NB	May 20, 2014	28 nm	[1] 2	2.2	3.0	96 KB inst. per module 16 KB data per core	1	—N/a					1600	15- 17	0-100	RE219NECH23JA
RX-225FB	May 20, 2014	28 nm	[1] 2	2.2	3.0	96 KB inst. per module 16 KB data per core	1	R4	192:12:4; 3 CU	464	533	178.1	1600	15- 17	0-100	RE225FECH23JA
RX-425BB	May 20, 2014	28 nm	[2] 4	2.5	3.4	96 KB inst. per module 16 KB data per core	4	R6	384:24:8; 6 CU	576	654	442.3	1866	30- 35	0-100	RE425BDGH44JA
RX-427BB	May 20, 2014	28 nm	[2] 4	2.7	3.6	96 KB inst. per module 16 KB data per core	4	R7	512:32:8; 8 CU	600	686	614.4	2133	30- 35	0-100	RE427BDGH44JA
RX-427NB	May 20, 2014	28 nm	[2] 4	2.7	3.6	96 KB inst. per module 16 KB data per core	4	—N/a					2133	30- 35	0-100	RE427NDGH44JA

==== "Merlin Falcon" (2015, SoC) ====
- Fabrication 28 nm
- Socket FP4
- Up to 4 Excavator x86 cores
- L1 Cache: 32 KB Data per core and 96 KB Instructions per module
- MMX, SSE, SSE2, SSE3, SSSE3, SSE4.1, SSE4.2, SSE4a, AMD64, AMD-V, AES, CLMUL, AVX, AVX2, XOP, FMA3, FMA4, F16C, ABM, BMI1, BMI2, TBM, RDRAND
- GPU microarchitecture: Graphics Core Next (GCN) (up to 8 CUs) with support for DirectX 12
- Dual channel 64-bit DDR4 or DDR3 memory with ECC
- Unified Video Decode (UVD) 6 (4K H.265 and H.264 decode) and Video Coding Engine (VCE) 3.1 (4K H.264 encode)
- Dedicated AMD Secure Processor supports secure boot with AMD Hardware Validated Boot (HVB)
- Integrated FCH featuring PCIe 3.0 USB3.0, SATA3, SD, GPIO, SPI, I2S, I2C, UART

Model	Released	Fab	Stepping	CPU						GPU					Memory support	TDP (W)	Junction temperature (°C)	Part number
Model	Released	Fab	Stepping	[Modules/FPUs] Cores/threads	Clock (GHz)	Turbo (GHz)	Cache (Note: AMD in its technical documentation uses KB, which it defines as Kilobyte and as equal to 1024 bytes, and MB, which it defines as Megabyte and as equal to 1024 KB.)			Model	Config	Clock (GHz)	Turbo	Processing power (GFLOPS) (Note: Single-precision performance is calculated from the base (or boost) core clock speed based on a FMA operation.)	Memory support	TDP (W)	Junction temperature (°C)	Part number
Model	Released	Fab	Stepping	[Modules/FPUs] Cores/threads	Clock (GHz)	Turbo (GHz)	L1	L2 (MB)	L3	Model	Config	Clock (GHz)	Turbo	Processing power (GFLOPS)	Memory support	TDP (W)	Junction temperature (°C)	Part number
RX-216TD	October 21, 2015	28 nm		[1] 2	1.6	3.0	96 KB inst. per module 32 KB data per core	1	—N/a	—N/a					DDR3/DDR4-1600	12- 15	0-90	RE216TAAY23KA
RX-216GD	October 21, 2015	28 nm		[1] 2	1.6	3.0	96 KB inst. per module 32 KB data per core	1	—N/a	R5	256:?:? 4 CU	0.8	—N/a	409.6	DDR3/DDR4-1600	12- 15	0-90	RE216GAAY23KA
RX-416GD		28 nm		[2] 4	1.6	2.4	96 KB inst. per module 32 KB data per core	2	—N/a	R6	384:?:? 6 CU	0.72	—N/a	552.9	DDR3/DDR4-1600	15	-40-105	RE416GATY43KA
RX-418GD	October 21, 2015	28 nm		[2] 4	1.8	3.2	96 KB inst. per module 32 KB data per core	2	—N/a	R6	384:?:? 6 CU	0.8	—N/a	614.4	DDR3-2133; DDR4-2400	12- 35	0-90	RE418GAAY43KA
RX-421BD	October 21, 2015	28 nm		[2] 4	2.1	3.4	96 KB inst. per module 32 KB data per core	2	—N/a	R7	512:?:? 8 CU	0.8	—N/a	819.2	DDR3-2133; DDR4-2400	12- 35	0-90	RE421BAAY43KA
RX-421ND	October 21, 2015	28 nm		[2] 4	2.1	3.4	96 KB inst. per module 32 KB data per core	2	—N/a	—N/a					DDR3-2133; DDR4-2400	12- 35	0-90	RE421NAAY43KA

=== 1000-Series ===
==== V1000-Family: "Great Horned Owl" (2018, SoC) ====
- Fabrication 14 nm by GlobalFoundries
- Up to 4 Zen cores
- Socket FP5
- MMX, SSE, SSE2, SSE3, SSSE3, SSE4.1, SSE4.2, SSE4a, AMD64, AMD-V, AES, CLMUL, AVX, AVX2, FMA3, F16C, ABM, BMI1, BMI2, RDRAND, Turbo Core
- Dual channel DDR4 memory with ECC
- Fifth generation GCN based GPU

Model	Release date	Fab	CPU						GPU				Memory support	TDP	Junction temp. range (°C)
Model	Release date	Fab	Cores (threads)	Clock rate (GHz)		Cache			Model	Config (Note: Unified Shaders : Texture Mapping Units : Render Output Units and Compute Units (CU))	Clock (GHz)	Processing power (GFLOPS) (Note: Single-precision performance is calculated from the base (or boost) core clock speed based on a FMA operation.)	Memory support	TDP	Junction temp. range (°C)
Model	Release date	Fab	Cores (threads)	Base	Boost	L1	L2	L3	Model	Config	Clock (GHz)	Processing power (GFLOPS)	Memory support	TDP	Junction temp. range (°C)
V1202B	February 2018	GloFo; 14LP	2 (4)	2.3	3.2	64 KB inst. 32 KB data per core	512 KB per core	4 MB	Vega 3	192:12:16; 3 CU	1.0	384	DDR4-2400 dual-channel	12–25 W	0–105
V1404I	December 2018	GloFo; 14LP	4 (8)	2.0	3.6	64 KB inst. 32 KB data per core	512 KB per core	4 MB	Vega 8	512:32:16; 8 CU	1.1	1126.4	DDR4-2400 dual-channel	12–25 W	-40–105
V1500B	December 2018	GloFo; 14LP	4 (8)	2.2	—N/a	64 KB inst. 32 KB data per core	512 KB per core	4 MB	—N/a				DDR4-2400 dual-channel	12–25 W	0–105
V1605B	February 2018	GloFo; 14LP	4 (8)	2.0	3.6	64 KB inst. 32 KB data per core	512 KB per core	4 MB	Vega 8	512:32:16; 8 CU	1.1	1126.4	DDR4-2400 dual-channel	12–25 W	0–105
V1756B	February 2018	GloFo; 14LP	4 (8)	3.25	3.6	64 KB inst. 32 KB data per core	512 KB per core	4 MB	Vega 8	512:32:16; 8 CU	1.1	1126.4	DDR4-3200 dual-channel	35–54 W	0–105
V1780B	December 2018	GloFo; 14LP	4 (8)	3.35	3.6	64 KB inst. 32 KB data per core	512 KB per core	4 MB	—N/a				DDR4-3200 dual-channel	35–54 W	0–105
V1807B	February 2018	GloFo; 14LP	4 (8)	3.35	3.8	64 KB inst. 32 KB data per core	512 KB per core	4 MB	Vega 11	704:44:16; 11 CU	1.3	1830.4	DDR4-3200 dual-channel	35–54 W	0–105

==== R1000-Family: "Banded Kestrel" (2019, SoC) ====
- Fabrication 14 nm by GlobalFoundries
- Up to 2 Zen cores
- Socket FP5
- MMX, SSE, SSE2, SSE3, SSSE3, SSE4.1, SSE4.2, SSE4a, AMD64, AMD-V, AES, CLMUL, AVX, AVX2, FMA3, F16C, ABM, BMI1, BMI2, RDRAND, Turbo Core
- Dual channel DDR4 memory with ECC
- Fifth generation GCN based GPU

Model	Release date	Fab	CPU						GPU				Memory support	TDP
Model	Release date	Fab	Cores (threads)	Clock rate (GHz)		Cache			Model	Config (Note: Unified Shaders : Texture Mapping Units : Render Output Units and Compute Units (CU))	Clock (GHz)	Processing power (GFLOPS) (Note: Single-precision performance is calculated from the base (or boost) core clock speed based on a FMA operation.)	Memory support	TDP
Model	Release date	Fab	Cores (threads)	Base	Boost	L1	L2	L3	Model	Config	Clock (GHz)	Processing power (GFLOPS)	Memory support	TDP
R1102G	February 25, 2020	GloFo; 14LP	2 (2)	1.2	2.6	64 KB inst. 32 KB data per core	512 KB per core	4 MB	Vega 3	192:12:4; 3 CU	1.0	384	DDR4-2400 single-channel	6 W
R1305G	February 25, 2020	GloFo; 14LP	2 (4)	1.5	2.8	64 KB inst. 32 KB data per core	512 KB per core	4 MB	Vega 3	192:12:4; 3 CU	1.0	384	DDR4-2400 dual-channel	8-10 W
R1505G	April 16, 2019	GloFo; 14LP	2 (4)	2.4	3.3	64 KB inst. 32 KB data per core	512 KB per core	4 MB	Vega 3	192:12:4; 3 CU	1.0	384	DDR4-2400 dual-channel	12–25 W
R1606G	April 16, 2019	GloFo; 14LP	2 (4)	2.6	3.5	64 KB inst. 32 KB data per core	512 KB per core	4 MB	Vega 3	192:12:4; 3 CU	1.2	460.8	DDR4-2400 dual-channel	12–25 W

=== 2000-Series ===
==== V2000-Family: "Grey Hawk" (2020, SoC) ====
- Fabrication 7 nm by TSMC
- Up to 8 Zen 2 cores
- Fifth generation GCN based GPU

Model	Release date	Fab	CPU						GPU				Socket	PCIe support	Memory support	TDP
Model	Release date	Fab	Cores (threads)	Clock rate (GHz)		Cache			Archi- tecture	Config (Note: Unified Shaders : Texture Mapping Units : Render Output Units and Compute Units (CU))	Clock (GHz)	Processing power (Note: Single-precision performance is calculated from the base (or boost) core clock speed based on a FMA operation.) (GFLOPS)	Socket	PCIe support	Memory support	TDP
Model	Release date	Fab	Cores (threads)	Base	Boost	L1	L2	L3	Archi- tecture	Config	Clock (GHz)	Processing power (GFLOPS)	Socket	PCIe support	Memory support	TDP
V2516	Nov 10, 2020	TSMC; 7FF	6 (12)	2.1	3.95	32 KB inst. 32 KB data per core	512 KB per core	8 MB	GCN 5	384:24:8; 6 CU	1.5	1152	FP6	20 (8+4+4+4); PCIe 3.0	DDR4-3200 dual-channel LPDDR4X-4266 quad-channel	10–25 W
V2546	Nov 10, 2020	TSMC; 7FF	6 (12)	3.0	3.95	32 KB inst. 32 KB data per core	512 KB per core	8 MB	GCN 5	384:24:8; 6 CU	1.5	1152	FP6	20 (8+4+4+4); PCIe 3.0	DDR4-3200 dual-channel LPDDR4X-4266 quad-channel	35–54 W
V2A46	Jan 4, 2023	TSMC; 7FF	6 (12)	3.0	3.2	32 KB inst. 32 KB data per core	512 KB per core	8 MB	GCN 5	448:28:8; 7 CU	1.6	1433.6	FP6	20 (8+4+4+4); PCIe 3.0	DDR4-3200 dual-channel LPDDR4X-4266 quad-channel	35–54 W
V2718	Nov 10, 2020	TSMC; 7FF	8 (16)	1.7	4.15	32 KB inst. 32 KB data per core	512 KB per core	8 MB	GCN 5	448:28:8; 7 CU	1.6	1433.6	FP6	20 (8+4+4+4); PCIe 3.0	DDR4-3200 dual-channel LPDDR4X-4266 quad-channel	10–25 W
V2748	Nov 10, 2020	TSMC; 7FF	8 (16)	2.9	4.25	32 KB inst. 32 KB data per core	512 KB per core	8 MB	GCN 5	448:28:8; 7 CU	1.6	1433.6	FP6	20 (8+4+4+4); PCIe 3.0	DDR4-3200 dual-channel LPDDR4X-4266 quad-channel	35–54 W

==== R2000-Family: "River Hawk" (2022, SoC) ====
- Fabrication 12 nm by GlobalFoundries
- Up to 4 Zen+ cores
- MMX, SSE, SSE2, SSE3, SSSE3, SSE4.1, SSE4.2, SSE4a, AMD64, AMD-V, AES, CLMUL, AVX, AVX2, FMA3, F16C, ABM, BMI1, BMI2, RDRAND, Turbo Core

Model	Release date	Fab	CPU						GPU				Socket	PCIe support	Memory support	TDP
Model	Release date	Fab	Cores (threads)	Clock rate (GHz)		Cache			Archi- tecture	Config (Note: Unified Shaders : Texture Mapping Units : Render Output Units and Compute Units (CU))	Clock (GHz)	Processing power (Note: Single-precision performance is calculated from the base (or boost) core clock speed based on a FMA operation.) (GFLOPS)	Socket	PCIe support	Memory support	TDP
Model	Release date	Fab	Cores (threads)	Base	Boost	L1	L2	L3	Archi- tecture	Config	Clock (GHz)	Processing power (GFLOPS)	Socket	PCIe support	Memory support	TDP
R2312	June 7, 2022	GloFo; 12LP	2 (4)	2.7	3.5	64 KB inst. 32 KB data per core	512 KB per core	4 MB	GCN 5	192:12:4; 3 CU	1.2	460.8	FP5	8 lanes Gen 3	DDR4-2400 dual-channel ECC	10–25 W
R2314	June 7, 2022	GloFo; 12LP	4 (4)	2.1	3.5	64 KB inst. 32 KB data per core	512 KB per core	4 MB	GCN 5	384:24:8; 6 CU	1.2	921.6	FP5	16 lanes Gen 3	DDR4-2666 dual-channel ECC	10–35 W

== Custom APUs ==
As of May 1, 2013, AMD opened the doors of their "semi-custom" business unit. Since these chips are custom-made for specific customer needs, they vary widely from both consumer-grade APUs and even the other custom-built ones. Some notable examples of semi-custom chips that have come from this sector include the chips from the PlayStation 4 and Xbox One. So far the size of the integrated GPU in these semi-custom APUs exceed by far the GPU size in the consumer-grade APUs.

Chip (device)	Release date	Fab	Die area (mm^{2})	CPU				GPU							Memory			Storage	API support	Special features	
Chip (device)	Release date	Fab	Die area (mm^{2})	Archi- tecture	Cores	Clock (GHz)	L2 cache	Archi- tecture	Core config (Note: Unified shaders : Texture mapping units : Render output units)	Clock (MHz)	GFLOPS (Note: Precision performance is calculated from the base (or boost) core clock speed based on a FMA operation.)	Pixel fillrate (GP/s) (Note: Pixel fillrate is calculated as the number of ROPs multiplied by the base (or boost) core clock speed.)	Texture fillrate (GT/s) (Note: Texture fillrate is calculated as the number of TMUs multiplied by the base (or boost) core clock speed.)	Other	Size	Bus type & width	Band- width (GB/s)	Storage	API support	Audio	Other
Liverpool (PS4)	Nov 2013	28 nm	348	Jaguar	8 cores	1.6	2× 2 MB	GCN 2	1152:72:32; 18 CU	800	1843	25.6	57.6	8 ACEs	8 GB	GDDR5; 256-bit	176	3DBD/DVD; 1× 2.5" SATA hard drive Easily replaceable hard drive USB 3.0	OpenGL 4.2, GNM, GNMX and PSSL	Dolby Atmos (BD); S/PDIF	PS VR; PS4 additional modules HDR10 (except discs) (Note: UHD BD is the only video disc format supporting HDR.); CEC; Optional IR sensor
Durango (Xbox One)	Nov 2013	28 nm	363	Jaguar	8 cores	1.75	2× 2 MB	GCN 2	768:48:16; 12 CU	853	1310	13.6	40.9	2 ACEs	32 MB	ESRAM (Note: Cache)	204	3DBD/DVD/CD; 1× 2.5" SATA hard drive USB 3.0	Direct3D 11.2 and 12	Fully Dolby Atmos, DTS:X, and Windows Sonic; S/PDIF	Xbox One additional modules FreeSync (1); HDMI 1.4 through IR sensor and IR out port Kensington lock
Durango (Xbox One)	Nov 2013	28 nm	363	Jaguar	8 cores	1.75	2× 2 MB	GCN 2	768:48:16; 12 CU	853	1310	13.6	40.9	2 ACEs	8 GB	DDR3; 256-bit	68	3DBD/DVD/CD; 1× 2.5" SATA hard drive USB 3.0	Direct3D 11.2 and 12	Fully Dolby Atmos, DTS:X, and Windows Sonic; S/PDIF	Xbox One additional modules FreeSync (1); HDMI 1.4 through IR sensor and IR out port Kensington lock
Edmonton (Xbox One S)	Jun 2016	16 nm	240	Jaguar	8 cores	1.75	2× 2 MB	GCN 2	768:48:16; 12 CU	914	1404	14.6	43.9	2 ACEs	32 MB	ESRAM	219	4KBD/3DBD/DVD/CD (Note: "Digital" version does not have an optical drive.); 1× 2.5" SATA hard drive USB 3.0	Direct3D 11.2 and 12	Fully Dolby Atmos, DTS:X, and Windows Sonic; S/PDIF	Xbox One S additional modules Fully HDR10; Dolby Vision (streaming); FreeSync (1&2); HDMI 1.4 through IR sensor and IR out port Kensington lock
Edmonton (Xbox One S)	Jun 2016	16 nm	240	Jaguar	8 cores	1.75	2× 2 MB	GCN 2	768:48:16; 12 CU	914	1404	14.6	43.9	2 ACEs	8 GB	DDR3; 256-bit	68	4KBD/3DBD/DVD/CD; 1× 2.5" SATA hard drive USB 3.0	Direct3D 11.2 and 12	Fully Dolby Atmos, DTS:X, and Windows Sonic; S/PDIF	Xbox One S additional modules Fully HDR10; Dolby Vision (streaming); FreeSync (1&2); HDMI 1.4 through IR sensor and IR out port Kensington lock
(PS4 Slim)	Sep 2016	16 nm	208	Jaguar	8 cores	1.6	2× 2 MB	GCN 2	1152:72:32; 18 CU	800	1843	25.6	57.6	8 ACEs	8 GB	GDDR5; 256-bit	176	3DBD/DVD; 1× 2.5" SATA hard drive Easily replaceable hard drive USB 3.0	OpenGL 4.2, GNM, GNMX and PSSL	Dolby Atmos (BD)	PS VR; PS4 Slim additional modules HDR10 (except discs); CEC; Optional IR sensor
Neo (PS4 Pro)	Nov 2016	16 nm	325	Jaguar	8 cores	2.13	2× 2 MB	GCN 4 (Polaris)	2304:144:32; 36 CU	911	4198	58.3	131.2	4 ACEs and 2 HWS; Double-rate FP16 (Note: Feature preview of Rapid Packed Math, introduced in GCN 5.) checkerboard rendering	8 GB	GDDR5; 256-bit	218	3DBD/DVD; 1× 2.5" SATA hard drive Easily replaceable hard drive USB 3.0	OpenGL 4.2 (4.5), GNM, GNMX and PSSL	Dolby Atmos (BD); S/PDIF	PS VR; PS4 Pro additional modules HDR10 (except discs); Up to 4K@60 Hz; CEC; Optional IR sensor
Neo (PS4 Pro)	Nov 2016	16 nm	325	Jaguar	8 cores	2.13	2× 2 MB	GCN 4 (Polaris)	2304:144:32; 36 CU	911	4198	58.3	131.2	4 ACEs and 2 HWS; Double-rate FP16 checkerboard rendering	1 GB	DDR3 (Note: Swap)	?	3DBD/DVD; 1× 2.5" SATA hard drive Easily replaceable hard drive USB 3.0	OpenGL 4.2 (4.5), GNM, GNMX and PSSL	Dolby Atmos (BD); S/PDIF	PS VR; PS4 Pro additional modules HDR10 (except discs); Up to 4K@60 Hz; CEC; Optional IR sensor
Scorpio (Xbox One X)	Nov 2017	16 nm	359	Customized; Jaguar	8 cores	2.3	2× 2 MB	GCN 4 (Polaris)	2560:160:32; 40 CU	1172	6001	37.5	187.5	4 ACEs and 2 HWS	12 GB	GDDR5; 384-bit	326	4KBD/3DBD/DVD/CD; 1× 2.5" SATA hard drive USB 3.0	Direct3D 11.2 and 12	Fully Dolby Atmos, DTS:X, and Windows Sonic; S/PDIF	Xbox One X additional modules Fully HDR10; Dolby Vision (streaming); FreeSync (1&2); Up to 4K@60 Hz; HDMI 1.4b through IR sensor and IR out port
Fenghuang (Subor Z+)	cancelled	14 nm	397	Zen	4 cores 8 threads	3.0		GCN 5	1536:96:32; 24 CU	1300	3994	41.6	124.8	Double-rate FP16	8 GB	GDDR5; 256-bit	154	1× 2.5" SATA SSD; 1× 2.5" SATA hard drive Easily replaceable drives USB 3.0	Vulkan 1.1, Direct3D 12.1	S/PDIF	Subor Z Plus additional modules Windows 10 Enterprise LTSC
Oberon (PS5)	Nov 2020	7 nm	308	Zen 2	8 cores 16 threads	3.5 (variable)	4 MB	RDNA 2	2304:144:64; 36 CU	2233 (variable)	10290 (variable)	142.9	321.6	Double-rate FP16; Real-time ray tracing Primitive shaders Custom 3D audio blocks	16 GB	GDDR6; 256-bit	448	4KBD/DVD; Custom 5.5 GB/s PCIe 4.0 x4 NVMe SSD; PCIe 4.0 M.2 slot Easily replaceable M.2 SSD; USB (except PS5 games)	Vulkan 1.2	PS5 TEMPEST 3D AudioTech	PS VR; Dedicated DMA controller and I/O coprocessors Custom coherency engines and cache scrubbers Custom decompression block HDR; Up to 4K@120 Hz; Up to 8K@30 Hz
Anaconda (Xbox Series X)	Nov 2020	7 nm	360	Zen 2	8 cores 16 threads	3.6 (3.8 w/o SMT)	4 MB	RDNA 2	3328:208:64; 52 CU	1825	12147	116.8	379.6	Double-rate FP16; Real-time ray tracing Mesh shaders Variable rate shading ANN acceleration	10 GB	GDDR6; 320-bit	560	4KBD/DVD; Custom 2.4 GB/s NVMe SSD; Custom expansion card USB 3.1 (except XSX games)	DirectX 12 Ultimate	Custom spatial audio block MS Project Acoustics; Fully Dolby Atmos, DTS:X, and Windows Sonic	Custom decompression block HDR; VRR; Up to 4K@120 Hz; Up to 8K@30 Hz; CEC
Anaconda (Xbox Series X)	Nov 2020	7 nm	360	Zen 2	8 cores 16 threads	3.6 (3.8 w/o SMT)	4 MB	RDNA 2	3328:208:64; 52 CU	1825	12147	116.8	379.6	Double-rate FP16; Real-time ray tracing Mesh shaders Variable rate shading ANN acceleration	6 GB	GDDR6; 192-bit (Note: A plain 320-bit 20 GB version could be made by just replacing four 1 GB GDDR6 chips by 2 GB ones.)	336	4KBD/DVD; Custom 2.4 GB/s NVMe SSD; Custom expansion card USB 3.1 (except XSX games)	DirectX 12 Ultimate	Custom spatial audio block MS Project Acoustics; Fully Dolby Atmos, DTS:X, and Windows Sonic	Custom decompression block HDR; VRR; Up to 4K@120 Hz; Up to 8K@30 Hz; CEC
Lockhart (Xbox Series S)	Nov 2020	7 nm	197	Zen 2	8 cores 16 threads	3.4 (3.6 w/o SMT)	4 MB	RDNA 2	1280:80:32; 20 CU	1565	4006	50.1	125.2	Double-rate FP16; Real-time ray tracing Mesh shaders Variable rate shading ANN acceleration	8 GB	GDDR6; 128-bit	224	Custom 2.4 GB/s NVMe SSD; Custom expansion card USB 3.1 (except XSX games)	DirectX 12 Ultimate	Custom spatial audio block MS Project Acoustics; Fully Dolby Atmos, DTS:X, and Windows Sonic	Custom decompression block HDR; VRR; Up to 4K@120 Hz; Up to 8K@30 Hz; CEC
Lockhart (Xbox Series S)	Nov 2020	7 nm	197	Zen 2	8 cores 16 threads	3.4 (3.6 w/o SMT)	4 MB	RDNA 2	1280:80:32; 20 CU	1565	4006	50.1	125.2	Double-rate FP16; Real-time ray tracing Mesh shaders Variable rate shading ANN acceleration	2 GB	GDDR6; 32-bit	56	Custom 2.4 GB/s NVMe SSD; Custom expansion card USB 3.1 (except XSX games)	DirectX 12 Ultimate	Custom spatial audio block MS Project Acoustics; Fully Dolby Atmos, DTS:X, and Windows Sonic	Custom decompression block HDR; VRR; Up to 4K@120 Hz; Up to 8K@30 Hz; CEC
Van Gogh "Aerith" (Steam Deck)	Dec 2021	7 nm	163	Zen 2	4 cores 8 threads	2.4-3.5	2 MB	RDNA 2	512:32:16; 8 CU	1000-1600	1000-1600	16-25.6	32-51.2	Double-rate FP16; Real-time ray tracing Variable rate shading	16 GB	LPDDR5; 128-bit	88	64 GB eMMC (PCIe Gen 2 × 1); 256 GB NVMe SSD (PCIe Gen 3 × 4); 512 GB NVMe SSD (PCIe Gen 3 × 4) microSD card slot	DirectX 9-12 Ultimate, OpenGL 4.6, Vulkan 1.2		
Van Gogh "Sephiroth" (Steam Deck OLED)	Nov 2023	6 nm	131	Zen 2	4 cores 8 threads	2.4-3.5	2 MB	RDNA 2	512:32:16; 8 CU	1000-1600	1000-1600	16-25.6	32-51.2	Double-rate FP16; Real-time ray tracing Variable rate shading	16 GB	LPDDR5; 128-bit	102	256 GB NVMe SSD (PCIe Gen 3 × 4); 512 GB NVMe SSD (PCIe Gen 3 × 4); 1 TB NVMe SSD (PCIe Gen 3 × 4) microSD card slot	DirectX 9-12 Ultimate, OpenGL 4.6, Vulkan 1.2		
Viola (PS5 Pro)	Nov 2024	4 nm	260	Zen 2	8 cores 16 threads	3.85 (variable)	4 MB	RDNA 3	3840:240:120; 60 CU	2180 (variable)	16742 (variable)	261.6	523.2	Double-rate FP16; Real-time ray tracing Primitive shaders Custom 3D audio blocks Hardware-accelerated upscaling	16 GB	GDDR6; 256-bit	576	4KBD/DVD; 2 TB NVMe SSD (PCIe Gen 4 × 4); PCIe 4.0 M.2 slot USB	Vulkan 1.2	PS5 TEMPEST 3D AudioTech	PS VR; Dedicated DMA controller and I/O coprocessors Custom coherency engines and cache scrubbers Custom decompression block HDR; Up to 4K@120 Hz; Up to 8K@60 Hz
Viola (PS5 Pro)	Nov 2024	4 nm	260	Zen 2	8 cores 16 threads	3.85 (variable)	4 MB	RDNA 3	3840:240:120; 60 CU	2180 (variable)	16742 (variable)	261.6	523.2	Double-rate FP16; Real-time ray tracing Primitive shaders Custom 3D audio blocks Hardware-accelerated upscaling	2 GB	DDR5	?	4KBD/DVD; 2 TB NVMe SSD (PCIe Gen 4 × 4); PCIe 4.0 M.2 slot USB	Vulkan 1.2	PS5 TEMPEST 3D AudioTech	PS VR; Dedicated DMA controller and I/O coprocessors Custom coherency engines and cache scrubbers Custom decompression block HDR; Up to 4K@120 Hz; Up to 8K@60 Hz

== See also ==
- List of AMD chipsets
- List of AMD FX microprocessors
- List of AMD graphics processing units
- Ryzen
