= Excavator (microarchitecture) =

Microarchitecture by AMD

Excavator – Family 15h (4th-gen)
General information
- Launched: June 2, 2015; 11 years ago
- Common manufacturer: AMD

Physical specifications
- Sockets: Socket FM2+ (Carrizo); Socket AM4 (Bristol Ridge); Socket FP3 (μBGA)

Architecture and classification
- Technology node: 28 nm bulk silicon (GF28A)
- Instruction set: AMD64 (x86-64)
- Extensions: Crypto AES, SHA; SIMD MMX-plus, SSE, SSE2, SSE3, SSSE3, SSE4.1, SSE4.2, SSE4A, FMA3, FMA4, AVX, AVX2

Products, models, variants
- Core names: Carrizo; Bristol Ridge; Stoney Ridge

History
- Predecessor: Steamroller – Family 15h (3rd-gen)
- Successor: Zen

Support status
- iGPU unsupported

The Excavator Family 15h is an x86-64 CPU microarchitecture developed by AMD for use in the company's CPU and APU CPUs, with commercial sales beginning in 2015. Excavator is the fourth and last microarchitecture derived from Bulldozer, and shares the same 28 nm manufacturing process with its predecessor, the Steamroller. It was succeeded by the Zen microarchitecture in early 2017.

The Excavator-based Carrizo chip is HSA 1.0 compliant. An Excavator-based APU and CPU variant named Toronto for server and enterprise markets was also produced.

== Architecture ==
Excavator added hardware support for new instructions such as AVX2, BMI2 and RDRAND. Excavator is designed using High Density (aka "Thin") Libraries normally used for GPUs to reduce electric energy consumption and die size, delivering a 30 percent increase in efficient energy use. Excavator can process up to 15% more instructions per clock compared to AMD's previous core Steamroller.

AMD's Fusion Controller Hub has been discontinued since the release of the Carrizo series of CPUs as it has been integrated into the same die as the rest of the CPU.

== Products ==
The following table shows features of AMD's processors with 3D graphics, including APUs (see also: List of AMD processors with 3D graphics).

| Platform | | | High, standard and low power | | | | | | | | | | | | | | Low and ultra-low power | | | | | | | | |
| Codename | Server | Basic | | | | | | Toronto | | | | | | | | | | | | | | | | | |
| Codename | Server | Micro | | | | | | | | | | | | | | | | Kyoto | | | | | | | |
| Codename | Desktop | Performance | | | | | | | | | | | | | Raphael | Phoenix | | | | | | | | | |
| Codename | Desktop | Mainstream | Llano | Trinity | Richland | Kaveri | Kaveri Refresh (Godavari) | Carrizo | Bristol Ridge | Raven Ridge | Picasso | Renoir | Cezanne | | Raphael | Phoenix | | | | | | | | | |
| Codename | Desktop | Entry | Llano | Trinity | Richland | Kaveri | Kaveri Refresh (Godavari) | Carrizo | Bristol Ridge | Raven Ridge | Picasso | Renoir | Cezanne | | | Phoenix | | | | | | | | | |
| Codename | Desktop | Basic | | | | | | | | | | | | | | | | Kabini | | | | Dalí | | | |
| Codename | Mobile | Performance | | | | | | | | | | Renoir | Cezanne | Rembrandt | Dragon Range | | | | | | | | | | |
| Codename | Mobile | Mainstream | Llano | Trinity | Richland | Kaveri | | Carrizo | Bristol Ridge | Raven Ridge | Picasso | Renoir Lucienne | Cezanne Barceló | Rembrandt | Dragon Range | Phoenix | | | | | | | | | |
| Codename | Mobile | Entry | Llano | Trinity | Richland | Kaveri | | Carrizo | Bristol Ridge | Raven Ridge | | | | | | | | | | | | Dalí | | | Mendocino |
| Codename | Mobile | Basic | | | | | | | | | | | | | | | Desna, Ontario, Zacate | Kabini, Temash | Beema, Mullins | Carrizo-L | Stoney Ridge | Dalí | Pollock | | Mendocino |
| Codename | Embedded | | | Trinity | | Bald Eagle | | Merlin Falcon, Brown Falcon | | Great Horned Owl | | Grey Hawk | | | | | Ontario, Zacate | Kabini | Steppe Eagle, Crowned Eagle, LX-Family | | Prairie Falcon | Banded Kestrel | | River Hawk | |
|---|---|---|---|---|---|---|---|---|---|---|---|---|---|---|---|---|---|---|---|---|---|---|---|---|---|
| Released | | | Aug 2011 | Oct 2012 | Jun 2013 | Jan 2014 | 2015 | Jun 2015 | Jun 2016 | Oct 2017 | Jan 2019 | Mar 2020 | Jan 2021 | Jan 2022 | Sep 2022 | Jan 2023 | Jan 2011 | May 2013 | Apr 2014 | May 2015 | Feb 2016 | Apr 2019 | Jul 2020 | Jun 2022 | Nov 2022 |
| CPU microarchitecture | | | K10 | Piledriver | | Steamroller | | Excavator | "Excavator+" | Zen | Zen+ | Zen 2 | Zen 3 | Zen 3+ | Zen 4 | | Bobcat | Jaguar | Puma | Puma+ | "Excavator+" | Zen | | Zen+ | "Zen 2+" |
| ISA | | | x86-64 v1 | x86-64 v2 | | | | x86-64 v3 | | | | | | | x86-64 v4 | | x86-64 v1 | x86-64 v2 | | | x86-64 v3 | | | | |
| Socket | Desktop | Performance | —N/a | | | | | | | | | | | | AM5 | —N/a | —N/a | | | | | | | | |
| Socket | Desktop | Mainstream | —N/a | | | | | AM4 | | | | | | —N/a | AM5 | —N/a | —N/a | | | | | | | | |
| Socket | Desktop | Entry | FM1 | FM2 | | FM2+ | | FM2+ (Note: For FM2+ Excavator models: A8-7680, A6-7480 & Athlon X4 845.), AM4 | AM4 | | | | | —N/a | | | —N/a | | | | | | | | |
| Socket | Desktop | Basic | —N/a | | | | | | | | | | | | | | —N/a | AM1 | —N/a | | | FP5 | —N/a | | |
| Socket | Other | | FS1 | FS1+, FP2 | | FP3 | | FP4 | | FP5 | | FP6 | | FP7 | FL1 | FP7; FP7r2; FP8 | FT1 | FT3 | FT3b | | FP4 | FP5 | FT5 | FP5 | FT6 |
| PCI Express version | | | 2.0 | | | 3.0 | | | | | | | | 4.0 | 5.0 | 4.0 | 2.0 | | | | 3.0 | | | | |
| CXL | | | —N/a | | | | | | | | | | | | | | —N/a | | | | | | | | |
| Fab. (nm) | | | GF 32SHP (HKMG SOI) | | | GF 28SHP (HKMG bulk) | | | | GF 14LPP (FinFET bulk) | GF 12LP (FinFET bulk) | TSMC N7 (FinFET bulk) | | TSMC N6 (FinFET bulk) | CCD: TSMC N5 (FinFET bulk) cIOD: TSMC N6 (FinFET bulk) | TSMC 4nm (FinFET bulk) | TSMC N40 (bulk) | TSMC N28 (HKMG bulk) | GF 28SHP (HKMG bulk) | | | GF 14LPP (FinFET bulk) | | GF 12LP (FinFET bulk) | TSMC N6 (FinFET bulk) |
| Die area (mm^{2}) | | | 228 | 246 | | 245 | | 245 | 250 | 210 | | 156 | 180 | 210 | CCD: (2x) 70 cIOD: 122 | 178 | 75 (+ 28 FCH) | 107 | | ? | 125 | 149 | | | ~100 |
| Min TDP (W) | | | 35 | 17 | | | | 12 | | | | 10 | | 15 | 65 | 35 | 4.5 | 4 | 3.95 | 10 | 6 | | | 12 | 8 |
| Max APU TDP (W) | | | 100 | | | 95 | | 65 | | | | | | 45 | 170 | 54 | 18 | 25 | | | | | 6 | 54 | 15 |
| Max stock APU base clock (GHz) | | | 3 | 3.8 | 4.1 | 4.1 | | 3.7 | 3.8 | 3.6 | 3.7 | 3.8 | 4.0 | 3.3 | 4.7 | 4.3 | 1.75 | 2.2 | 2 | 2.2 | 3.2 | 2.6 | 1.2 | 3.35 | 2.8 |
| Max APUs per node (Note: A PC would be one node.) | | | 1 | | | | | | | | | | | | | | 1 | | | | | | | | |
| Max core dies per CPU | | | 1 | | | | | | | | | | | | 2 | 1 | 1 | | | | | | | | |
| Max CCX per core die | | | 1 | | | | | | | | | 2 | 1 | | | | 1 | | | | | | | | |
| Max cores per CCX | | | 4 | | | | | | | | | | 8 | | | | 2 | 4 | | | 2 | | | 4 | |
| Max CPU (Note: An APU combines a CPU and a GPU. Both have cores.) cores per APU | | | 4 | | | | | | | | | 8 | | | 16 | 8 | 2 | 4 | | | 2 | | | 4 | |
| Max threads per CPU core | | | 1 | | | | | | | 2 | | | | | | | 1 | | | | | 2 | | | |
| Integer pipeline structure | | | 3+3 | 2+2 | | | | | | 4+2 | | 4+2+1 | 1+3+3+1+2 | | | | 1+1+1+1 | | | | 2+2 | 4+2 | | | 4+2+1 |
| i386, i486, i586, CMOV, NOPL, i686, PAE, NX bit, CMPXCHG16B, AMD-V, RVI, ABM, and 64-bit LAHF/SAHF | | | Yes | | | | | | | | | | | | | | Yes | | | | | | | | |
| IOMMU (Note: Requires firmware support.) | | | —N/a | v2 | | | | | | | | | | | | | v1 | | v2 | | | | | | |
| BMI1, AES-NI, CLMUL, and F16C | | | —N/a | Yes | | | | | | | | | | | | | —N/a | Yes | | | | | | | |
| MOVBE | | | —N/a | | | | | Yes | | | | | | | | | —N/a | Yes | | | | | | | |
| AVIC, BMI2, RDRAND, and MWAITX/MONITORX | | | —N/a | | | | | Yes | | | | | | | | | —N/a | | | | Yes | | | | |
| SME (Note: Requires firmware support.), TSME, ADX, SHA, RDSEED, SMAP, SMEP, XSAVEC, XSAVES, XRSTORS, CLFLUSHOPT, CLZERO, and PTE Coalescing | | | —N/a | | | | | | | Yes | | | | | | | —N/a | | | | | Yes | | | |
| GMET, WBNOINVD, CLWB, QOS, PQE-BW, RDPID, RDPRU, and MCOMMIT | | | —N/a | | | | | | | | | Yes | | | | | —N/a | | | | | | | | Yes |
| MPK, VAES | | | —N/a | | | | | | | | | | Yes | | | | —N/a | | | | | | | | |
| SGX | | | —N/a | | | | | | | | | | | | | | —N/a | | | | | | | | |
| FPUs per core | | | 1 | 0.5 | | | | | | 1 | | | | | | | 1 | | | | 0.5 | 1 | | | |
| Pipes per FPU | | | 2 | | | | | | | | | | | | | | 2 | | | | | | | | |
| FPU pipe width | | | 128-bit | | | | | | | | | 256-bit | | | | | 80-bit | 128-bit | | | | | | | 256-bit |
| CPU instruction set SIMD level | | | SSE4a (Note: No SSE4. No SSSE3.) | AVX | | | | AVX2 | | | | | | | AVX-512 | | SSSE3 | AVX | | | AVX2 | | | | |
| 3DNow! | | | 3DNow!+ | —N/a | | | | | | | | | | | | | —N/a | | | | | | | | |
| PREFETCH/PREFETCHW | | | Yes | | | | | | | | | | | | | | Yes | | | | | | | | |
| GFNI | | | —N/a | | | | | | | | | | | | Yes | | —N/a | | | | | | | | |
| AMX | | | —N/a | | | | | | | | | | | | | | —N/a | | | | | | | | |
| FMA4, LWP, TBM, and XOP | | | —N/a | Yes | | | | | | —N/a | | | | | | | —N/a | | | | Yes | —N/a | | | |
| FMA3 | | | —N/a | Yes | | | | | | | | | | | | | —N/a | | | | Yes | | | | |
| AMD XDNA | | | —N/a | | | | | | | | | | | | | Yes | —N/a | | | | | | | | |
| L1 data cache per core (KiB) | | | 64 | 16 | | | | 32 | | | | | | | | | 32 | | | | | | | | |
| L1 data cache associativity (ways) | | | 2 | 4 | | | | 8 | | | | | | | | | 8 | | | | | | | | |
| L1 instruction caches per core | | | 1 | 0.5 | | | | | | 1 | | | | | | | 1 | | | | 0.5 | 1 | | | |
| Max APU total L1 instruction cache (KiB) | | | 256 | 128 | | 192 | | | | 256 | | | | | 512 | 256 | 64 | | 128 | | 96 | 128 | | | |
| L1 instruction cache associativity (ways) | | | 2 | | | 3 | | | | 4 | | 8 | | | | | 2 | | | | 3 | 4 | | | 8 |
| L2 caches per core | | | 1 | 0.5 | | | | | | 1 | | | | | | | 1 | | | | 0.5 | 1 | | | |
| Max APU total L2 cache (MiB) | | | 4 | | | | | 2 | | | | 4 | | | 16 | | 1 | 2 | | | 1 | | | 2 | |
| L2 cache associativity (ways) | | | 16 | | | | | | | 8 | | | | | | | 16 | | | | | 8 | | | |
| Max on-die L3 cache per CCX (MiB) | | | —N/a | | | | | | | 4 | | | 16 | | 32 | | —N/a | | | | | | 4 | | |
| Max 3D V-Cache per CCD (MiB) | | | —N/a | | | | | | | —N/a | | | | | 64 | —N/a | —N/a | | | | | | —N/a | | |
| Max total in-CCD L3 cache per APU (MiB) | | | —N/a | | | | | | | 4 | | 8 | 16 | | 64 | | —N/a | | | | | | 4 | | |
| Max. total 3D V-Cache per APU (MiB) | | | —N/a | | | | | | | —N/a | | | | | 64 | —N/a | —N/a | | | | | | —N/a | | |
| Max. board L3 cache per APU (MiB) | | | —N/a | | | | | | | —N/a | | | | | | | —N/a | | | | | | —N/a | | |
| Max total L3 cache per APU (MiB) | | | —N/a | | | | | | | 4 | | 8 | 16 | | 128 | | —N/a | | | | | | 4 | | |
| APU L3 cache associativity (ways) | | | —N/a | | | | | | | 16 | | | | | | | —N/a | | | | | | 16 | | |
| L3 cache scheme | | | —N/a | | | | | | | Victim | | | | | | | —N/a | | | | | | Victim | | |
| Max. L4 cache | | | —N/a | | | | | | | | | | | | | | —N/a | | | | | | | | |
| Max stock DRAM support | | | DDR3-1866 | | DDR3-2133 | | | DDR3-2133, DDR4-2400 | DDR4-2400 | DDR4-2933 | | DDR4-3200, LPDDR4-4266 | | DDR5-4800, LPDDR5-6400 | DDR5-5200 | DDR5-5600, LPDDR5x-7500 | DDR3L-1333 | DDR3L-1600 | DDR3L-1866 | | DDR3-1866, DDR4-2400 | DDR4-2400 | DDR4-1600 | DDR4-3200 | LPDDR5-5500 |
| Max DRAM channels per APU | | | 2 | | | | | | | | | | | | | | 1 | | | | | 2 | 1 | 2 | |
| Max stock DRAM bandwidth (GB/s) per APU | | | 29.866 | | 34.132 | | | 38.400 | | 46.932 | | 68.256 | | 102.400 | 83.200 | 120.000 | 10.666 | 12.800 | 14.933 | | 19.200 | 38.400 | 12.800 | 51.200 | 88.000 |
| GPU microarchitecture | | | TeraScale 2 (VLIW5) | TeraScale 3 (VLIW4) | | GCN 2nd gen | | GCN 3rd gen | | GCN 5th gen | | | | RDNA 2 | | RDNA 3 | TeraScale 2 (VLIW5) | GCN 2nd gen | | | GCN 3rd gen | GCN 5th gen | | | RDNA 2 |
| GPU instruction set | | | TeraScale instruction set | | | GCN instruction set | | | | | | | | RDNA instruction set | | | TeraScale instruction set | GCN instruction set | | | | | | | RDNA instruction set |
| Max stock GPU base clock (MHz) | | | 600 | 800 | 844 | 866 | | 1108 | | 1250 | 1400 | 2100 | | 2400 | 400 | | 538 | 600 | ? | 847 | 900 | 1200 | 600 | 1300 | 1900 |
| Max stock GPU base GFLOPS (Note: Single-precision performance is calculated from the base (or boost) core clock speed based on a FMA operation.) | | | 480 | 614.4 | 648.1 | 886.7 | | 1134.5 | | 1760 | 1971.2 | 2150.4 | | 3686.4 | 102.4 | | 86 | ? | ? | ? | 345.6 | 460.8 | 230.4 | 1331.2 | 486.4 |
| 3D engine (Note: Unified shaders : texture mapping units : render output units) | | | Up to 400:20:8 | Up to 384:24:6 | | Up to 512:32:8 | | | | Up to 704:44:16 | | Up to 512:32:8 | | 768:48:8 | 128:8:4 | | 80:8:4 | 128:8:4 | | | Up to 192:12:8 | Up to 192:12:4 | 192:12:4 | Up to 512:?:? | 128:?:? |
| 3D engine | | | IOMMUv1 | | | IOMMUv2 | | | | | | | | | | | IOMMUv1 | | ? | | IOMMUv2 | | | | |
| Video decoder | | | UVD 3.0 | | | UVD 4.2 | | UVD 6.0 | | VCN 1.0 | | VCN 2.1 | VCN 2.2 | VCN 3.1 | | ? | UVD 3.0 | UVD 4.0 | UVD 4.2 | | UVD 6.2 | VCN 1.0 | | | VCN 3.1 |
| Video encoder | | | —N/a | VCE 1.0 | | VCE 2.0 | | VCE 3.1 | | VCN 1.0 | | VCN 2.1 | VCN 2.2 | VCN 3.1 | | ? | —N/a | VCE 2.0 | | | VCE 3.4 | VCN 1.0 | | | VCN 3.1 |
| AMD Fluid Motion | | | No | | | Yes | | | | No | | | | | | | No | | Yes | | | No | | | |
| GPU power saving | | | PowerPlay | PowerTune | | | | | | | | | | | | | PowerPlay | PowerTune | | | | | | | |
| TrueAudio | | | —N/a | | | Yes | | | | | | | ? | | | | —N/a | Yes | | | | | | | |
| FreeSync | | | —N/a | | | 1; 2 | | | | | | | | | | | —N/a | 1; 2 | | | | | | | |
| HDCP (Note: To play protected video content, it also requires card, operating system, driver, and application support. A compatible HDCP display is also needed for this. HDCP is mandatory for the output of certain audio formats, placing additional constraints on the multimedia setup.) | | | ? | | | 1.4 | | | | 2.2 | | | | 2.3 | | | ? | 1.4 | | | | 2.2 | | | 2.3 |
| PlayReady | | | —N/a | | | | | | | 3.0 not yet | | | | | | | —N/a | | | | | 3.0 not yet | | | |
| Supported displays (Note: To feed more than two displays, the additional panels must have native DisplayPort support. Alternatively active DisplayPort-to-DVI/HDMI/VGA adapters can be employed.) | | | 2–3 | 2–4 | | | | 3 | | 3 (desktop); 4 (mobile, embedded) | | 4 | | | | | 2 | | | | 3 | 4 | | 4 | |
| /drm/radeon (Note: DRM (Direct Rendering Manager) is a component of the Linux kernel. Support in this table refers to the most current version.) | | | Yes | | | | | | —N/a | | | | | | | | Yes | | | | —N/a | | | | |
| /drm/amdgpu | | | —N/a | | | Yes | | | | | | | | | | | —N/a | Yes | | | | | | | |

== Processors ==
=== APU lines ===
There are three APU lines announced or released:

1. Budget and mainstream markets (desktop and mobile): Carrizo APU
  - The Carrizo mobile APUs were launched in 2015 based on Excavator x86 cores and featuring Heterogeneous System Architecture for integrated task sharing between CPUs and GPUs, which allows a GPU to perform compute functions, which is claimed provide greater performance increases than shrinking the feature size alone.
  - Carrizo desktop APUs were launched in 2018. The mainstream product (A8-7680) has 4 Excavator cores and a GPU based on GCN1.2 architecture. Also, an entry-level APU (A6-7480) with 2 Excavator cores is also launched.
2. Budget and mainstream markets (desktop and mobile): Bristol Ridge, and Stoney Ridge (for entry level notebooks), APUs
  - Bristol Ridge APUs utilize socket AM4 and DDR4 RAM
  - Bristol Ridge APUs have up to 4 Excavator CPU cores and up to 8 3rd generation GCN GPU cores
  - Up to a 20% CPU performance increase over Carrizo
  - TDP of 15W to 65W, 15–35W for mobile
3. Enterprise and server markets: Toronto APU
  - The Toronto APU for server and enterprise markets featured four x86 Excavator CPU core modules and Volcanic Islands integrated GPU core.
  - The Excavator cores has a greater advantage with IPC than Steamroller. The improvement is 4–15%.
  - Support for HSA/hUMA, DDR3/DDR4, PCIe 3.0, GCN 1.2
  - The Toronto APU was available in BGA and SoC variants. The SoC variant had the southbridge on the same die as the APU to save space and power and to optimize workloads.
  - A complete system with a Toronto APU would have a maximum power usage of 70 W.

==== CPU Desktop lines ====
There are no CPUs built on Steamroller (3rd gen Bulldozer) or Excavator (4th gen Bulldozer) architectures on high-end desktop platforms.

Excavator CPU for Desktop announced on February 2, 2016, named Athlon X4 845. In 2017, three more desktop CPUs (Athlon X4 9x0) were launched. They come in Socket AM4, with a TDP of 65W. In fact, they are APUs with their graphics cores disabled.

List of desktop Excavator CPUs
| Brand Name | Model Number | Code Name | Freq. (GHz) | | Cores | TDP (W) | Socket | Cache | | PCI Express 3.0 | Relative IPC | Locked |
| Brand Name | Model Number | Code Name | Base | Turbo | Cores | TDP (W) | Socket | L1D | L2 | PCI Express 3.0 | Relative IPC | Locked |
|---|---|---|---|---|---|---|---|---|---|---|---|---|
| Athlon X4 | 845 | Carrizo | 3.5 | 3.8 | 4 | 65 | FM2+ | 4x 32KB | 2x 1MB | x8 | 1.0 | Yes |
| Athlon X4 | 940 | Bristol Ridge | 3.2 | 3.6 | 4 | 65 | AM4 | 4x 32KB | 2x 1MB | x16 | 1.1 | No |
| Athlon X4 | 950 | Bristol Ridge | 3.5 | 3.8 | 4 | 65 | AM4 | 4x 32KB | 2x 1MB | x16 | 1.1 | No |
| Athlon X4 | 970 | Bristol Ridge | 3.8 | 4.0 | 4 | 65 | AM4 | 4x 32KB | 2x 1MB | x16 | 1.1 | No |

=== Server lines ===
The AMD Opteron roadmaps for 2015 show the Excavator-based Toronto APU and Toronto CPU intended for 1 Processor (1P) cluster applications:

- For 1P Web and Enterprise Services Clusters:
  - Toronto CPU – quad-core x86 Excavator architecture
  - plans for Cambridge CPU – 64-bit AArch64 core
- For 1P Compute and Media Clusters:
  - Toronto APU – quad-core x86 Excavator architecture
- For 2P/4P Servers:
  - Warsaw CPU – 12/16 core x86 Piledriver (2nd gen Bulldozer) (Opteron 6338P and 6370P)
  - no plans for Steamroller (3rd gen Bulldozer) or Excavator (4th gen Bulldozer) architectures on high-end multi-processor platforms

| Turion / ULV | | Node range label | x86 | | | |
| Microarchi. | Step | Node range label | Microarchi. | Step | | |
| | | 180 nm | K7 | Athlon Classic | | |
| | | 180 nm | K7 | Thunderbird | | |
| | | 180 nm | K7 | Palomino | | |
| | | 130 nm | K7 | Thoroughbred | | |
| | | 130 nm | K7 | Barton/Thorton | | |
| | | 130 nm | K8 | ClawHammer | | |
| | | 130 nm | K8 | Newcastle | | |
| | | 130 nm | K8 | SledgeHammer | | |
| K8L | Lancaster | 90 nm | K8 | Winchester | K8(×2) | K9 |
| K8L | Richmond | 90 nm | K8 | San Diego | Toledo | ~~Greyhound~~ |
| K8L | Taylor / Trinidad | 90 nm | K8 | San Diego | Windsor | |
| K8L | Tyler | 65 nm | K8 | Orleans | Brisbane | |
| K8L | Lion | 65 nm | K10 | Phenom | 4 cores on mainstream desktop, DDR3 introduced | |
| K8L | Caspian | 45 nm | K10 | Phenom II / Athlon II | 6 cores on mainstream desktop | |
| 14h | Bobcat | 40 nm | | | | |
| | | 32 nm | K10 | Lynx | | |
| | | 32 nm | K10 | Llano | APU introduced; CPU and GPU on single die | |
| | | 32 nm | Bulldozer 15h | Bulldozer | 8 cores on mainstream desktop | |
| | | 32 nm | Bulldozer 15h | Piledriver | | |
| 16h | Jaguar | 28 nm | Bulldozer 15h | Steamroller | APU/mobile-only | |
| 16h | Puma | 28 nm | Bulldozer 15h | Excavator | APU/mobile-only, DDR4 introduced | |
| K12 | ~~K12 (ARM64)~~ | 14 nm | Zen | Zen | SMT introduced | |
| | | 12 nm | Zen | Zen+ | | |
| | | 7 nm | Zen | Zen 2 | 12 and 16 cores on mainstream desktop, chiplet design | |
| | | 7 nm | Zen | Zen 3 | 3D V-Cache variants introduced | |
| | | 6 nm | Zen | Zen 3+ | Mobile-only, DDR5 introduced | |
| | | 5 nm / 4 nm | Zen | Zen 4 | High core density "Cloud" (Zen xc) variants introduced | |
| | | 4 nm / 3 nm | Zen | Zen 5 | Ryzen AI NPU cores introduced | |
| | | 3 nm / 2 nm | Zen | Zen 6 | | |
| | | 16A / 14A | Zen | Zen 7 | | |
