= Steamroller (microarchitecture) =

Microarchitecture by AMD

Steamroller - Family 15h (3rd-gen)
General information
- Launched: January 14, 2014; 12 years ago
- Common manufacturer: AMD

Physical specifications
- Sockets: Socket FM2+; Socket FP3 (μBGA)

Architecture and classification
- Technology node: 28 nm SHP
- Instruction set: AMD64 (x86-64)
- Extensions: Crypto AES, SHA; SIMD MMX-plus, SSE, SSE2, SSE3, SSSE3, SSE4.1, SSE4.2, SSE4A, FMA3, FMA4, AVX

Products, models, variants
- Core name: Kaveri APU

History
- Predecessor: Piledriver - Family 15h (2nd-gen)
- Successor: Excavator - Family 15h (4th-gen)

Support status
- iGPU unsupported

AMD Steamroller Family 15h is a microarchitecture developed by AMD for AMD APUs, which succeeded Piledriver in the beginning of 2014 as the third-generation Bulldozer-based microarchitecture. Steamroller APUs continue to use two-core modules as their predecessors, while aiming at achieving greater levels of parallelism.

== Microarchitecture ==
Steamroller still features two-core modules found in Bulldozer and Piledriver designs called clustered multi-thread (CMT), meaning that one module is marketed as a dual-core processor. The focus of Steamroller is for greater parallelism. Improvements center on independent instruction decoders for each core within a module, 25% more of the maximum width dispatches per thread, better instruction schedulers, improved perceptron branch predictor, larger and smarter caches, up to 30% fewer instruction cache misses, branch misprediction rate reduced by 20%, dynamically resizable L2 cache, micro-operations queue, more internal register resources and improved memory controller.

AMD estimated that these improvements will increase instructions per cycle (IPC) up to 30% compared to the first-generation Bulldozer core while maintaining Piledriver's high clock rates with decreased power consumption. The final result was a 9% single-threaded IPC improvement, and 18% multi-threaded IPC improvement over Piledriver.

Steamroller, the microarchitecture for CPUs, as well as Graphics Core Next, the microarchitecture for GPUs, are paired together in the APU lines to support features specified in Heterogeneous System Architecture.

== History ==
In 2011, AMD announced a third-generation Bulldozer-based line of processors for 2013, with Next Generation Bulldozer as the working title, using the 28 nm manufacturing process.

On 21 September 2011, leaked AMD slides indicated that this third generation of Bulldozer core was codenamed Steamroller.

In January 2014, the first Kaveri APUs became available.

Starting from May 2015 till March 2016 new APUs were launched as Kaveri-refresh (codenamed Godavari).

== Features ==
The following table shows features of AMD's processors with 3D graphics, including APUs (see also: List of AMD processors with 3D graphics).

Platform			High, standard and low power														Low and ultra-low power								
Codename	Server	Basic						Toronto																	
Codename	Server	Micro																Kyoto							
Codename	Desktop	Performance													Raphael	Phoenix									
Codename	Desktop	Mainstream	Llano	Trinity	Richland	Kaveri	Kaveri Refresh (Godavari)	Carrizo	Bristol Ridge	Raven Ridge	Picasso	Renoir	Cezanne		Raphael	Phoenix									
Codename	Desktop	Entry	Llano	Trinity	Richland	Kaveri	Kaveri Refresh (Godavari)	Carrizo	Bristol Ridge	Raven Ridge	Picasso	Renoir	Cezanne			Phoenix									
Codename	Desktop	Basic																Kabini				Dalí			
Codename	Mobile	Performance										Renoir	Cezanne	Rembrandt	Dragon Range										
Codename	Mobile	Mainstream	Llano	Trinity	Richland	Kaveri		Carrizo	Bristol Ridge	Raven Ridge	Picasso	Renoir Lucienne	Cezanne Barceló	Rembrandt	Dragon Range	Phoenix									
Codename	Mobile	Entry	Llano	Trinity	Richland	Kaveri		Carrizo	Bristol Ridge	Raven Ridge												Dalí			Mendocino
Codename	Mobile	Basic															Desna, Ontario, Zacate	Kabini, Temash	Beema, Mullins	Carrizo-L	Stoney Ridge	Dalí	Pollock		Mendocino
Codename	Embedded			Trinity		Bald Eagle		Merlin Falcon, Brown Falcon		Great Horned Owl		Grey Hawk					Ontario, Zacate	Kabini	Steppe Eagle, Crowned Eagle, LX-Family		Prairie Falcon	Banded Kestrel		River Hawk	
Released			Aug 2011	Oct 2012	Jun 2013	Jan 2014	2015	Jun 2015	Jun 2016	Oct 2017	Jan 2019	Mar 2020	Jan 2021	Jan 2022	Sep 2022	Jan 2023	Jan 2011	May 2013	Apr 2014	May 2015	Feb 2016	Apr 2019	Jul 2020	Jun 2022	Nov 2022
CPU microarchitecture			K10	Piledriver		Steamroller		Excavator	"Excavator+"	Zen	Zen+	Zen 2	Zen 3	Zen 3+	Zen 4		Bobcat	Jaguar	Puma	Puma+	"Excavator+"	Zen		Zen+	"Zen 2+"
ISA			x86-64 v1	x86-64 v2				x86-64 v3							x86-64 v4		x86-64 v1	x86-64 v2			x86-64 v3				
Socket	Desktop	Performance	—N/a												AM5	—N/a	—N/a								
Socket	Desktop	Mainstream	—N/a					AM4						—N/a	AM5	—N/a	—N/a								
Socket	Desktop	Entry	FM1	FM2		FM2+		FM2+ (Note: For FM2+ Excavator models: A8-7680, A6-7480 & Athlon X4 845.), AM4	AM4					—N/a			—N/a								
Socket	Desktop	Basic	—N/a														—N/a	AM1	—N/a			FP5	—N/a		
Socket	Other		FS1	FS1+, FP2		FP3		FP4		FP5		FP6		FP7	FL1	FP7; FP7r2; FP8	FT1	FT3	FT3b		FP4	FP5	FT5	FP5	FT6
PCI Express version			2.0			3.0								4.0	5.0	4.0	2.0				3.0				
CXL			—N/a														—N/a								
Fab. (nm)			GF 32SHP (HKMG SOI)			GF 28SHP (HKMG bulk)				GF 14LPP (FinFET bulk)	GF 12LP (FinFET bulk)	TSMC N7 (FinFET bulk)		TSMC N6 (FinFET bulk)	CCD: TSMC N5 (FinFET bulk) cIOD: TSMC N6 (FinFET bulk)	TSMC 4nm (FinFET bulk)	TSMC N40 (bulk)	TSMC N28 (HKMG bulk)	GF 28SHP (HKMG bulk)			GF 14LPP (FinFET bulk)		GF 12LP (FinFET bulk)	TSMC N6 (FinFET bulk)
Die area (mm^{2})			228	246		245		245	250	210		156	180	210	CCD: (2x) 70 cIOD: 122	178	75 (+ 28 FCH)	107		?	125	149			~100
Min TDP (W)			35	17				12				10		15	65	35	4.5	4	3.95	10	6			12	8
Max APU TDP (W)			100			95		65						45	170	54	18	25					6	54	15
Max stock APU base clock (GHz)			3	3.8	4.1	4.1		3.7	3.8	3.6	3.7	3.8	4.0	3.3	4.7	4.3	1.75	2.2	2	2.2	3.2	2.6	1.2	3.35	2.8
Max APUs per node (Note: A PC would be one node.)			1														1								
Max core dies per CPU			1												2	1	1								
Max CCX per core die			1									2	1				1								
Max cores per CCX			4										8				2	4			2			4	
Max CPU (Note: An APU combines a CPU and a GPU. Both have cores.) cores per APU			4									8			16	8	2	4			2			4	
Max threads per CPU core			1							2							1					2			
Integer pipeline structure			3+3	2+2						4+2		4+2+1	1+3+3+1+2				1+1+1+1				2+2	4+2			4+2+1
i386, i486, i586, CMOV, NOPL, i686, PAE, NX bit, CMPXCHG16B, AMD-V, RVI, ABM, and 64-bit LAHF/SAHF			Yes														Yes								
IOMMU (Note: Requires firmware support.)			—N/a	v2													v1		v2						
BMI1, AES-NI, CLMUL, and F16C			—N/a	Yes													—N/a	Yes							
MOVBE			—N/a					Yes									—N/a	Yes							
AVIC, BMI2, RDRAND, and MWAITX/MONITORX			—N/a					Yes									—N/a				Yes				
SME (Note: Requires firmware support.), TSME, ADX, SHA, RDSEED, SMAP, SMEP, XSAVEC, XSAVES, XRSTORS, CLFLUSHOPT, CLZERO, and PTE Coalescing			—N/a							Yes							—N/a					Yes			
GMET, WBNOINVD, CLWB, QOS, PQE-BW, RDPID, RDPRU, and MCOMMIT			—N/a									Yes					—N/a								Yes
MPK, VAES			—N/a										Yes				—N/a								
SGX			—N/a														—N/a								
FPUs per core			1	0.5						1							1				0.5	1			
Pipes per FPU			2														2								
FPU pipe width			128-bit									256-bit					80-bit	128-bit							256-bit
CPU instruction set SIMD level			SSE4a (Note: No SSE4. No SSSE3.)	AVX				AVX2							AVX-512		SSSE3	AVX			AVX2				
3DNow!			3DNow!+	—N/a													—N/a								
PREFETCH/PREFETCHW			Yes														Yes								
GFNI			—N/a												Yes		—N/a								
AMX			—N/a														—N/a								
FMA4, LWP, TBM, and XOP			—N/a	Yes						—N/a							—N/a				Yes	—N/a			
FMA3			—N/a	Yes													—N/a				Yes				
AMD XDNA			—N/a													Yes	—N/a								
L1 data cache per core (KiB)			64	16				32									32								
L1 data cache associativity (ways)			2	4				8									8								
L1 instruction caches per core			1	0.5						1							1				0.5	1			
Max APU total L1 instruction cache (KiB)			256	128		192				256					512	256	64		128		96	128			
L1 instruction cache associativity (ways)			2			3				4		8					2				3	4			8
L2 caches per core			1	0.5						1							1				0.5	1			
Max APU total L2 cache (MiB)			4					2				4			16		1	2			1			2	
L2 cache associativity (ways)			16							8							16					8			
Max on-die L3 cache per CCX (MiB)			—N/a							4			16		32		—N/a						4		
Max 3D V-Cache per CCD (MiB)			—N/a							—N/a					64	—N/a	—N/a						—N/a		
Max total in-CCD L3 cache per APU (MiB)			—N/a							4		8	16		64		—N/a						4		
Max. total 3D V-Cache per APU (MiB)			—N/a							—N/a					64	—N/a	—N/a						—N/a		
Max. board L3 cache per APU (MiB)			—N/a							—N/a							—N/a						—N/a		
Max total L3 cache per APU (MiB)			—N/a							4		8	16		128		—N/a						4		
APU L3 cache associativity (ways)			—N/a							16							—N/a						16		
L3 cache scheme			—N/a							Victim							—N/a						Victim		
Max. L4 cache			—N/a														—N/a								
Max stock DRAM support			DDR3-1866		DDR3-2133			DDR3-2133, DDR4-2400	DDR4-2400	DDR4-2933		DDR4-3200, LPDDR4-4266		DDR5-4800, LPDDR5-6400	DDR5-5200	DDR5-5600, LPDDR5x-7500	DDR3L-1333	DDR3L-1600	DDR3L-1866		DDR3-1866, DDR4-2400	DDR4-2400	DDR4-1600	DDR4-3200	LPDDR5-5500
Max DRAM channels per APU			2														1					2	1	2	
Max stock DRAM bandwidth (GB/s) per APU			29.866		34.132			38.400		46.932		68.256		102.400	83.200	120.000	10.666	12.800	14.933		19.200	38.400	12.800	51.200	88.000
GPU microarchitecture			TeraScale 2 (VLIW5)	TeraScale 3 (VLIW4)		GCN 2nd gen		GCN 3rd gen		GCN 5th gen				RDNA 2		RDNA 3	TeraScale 2 (VLIW5)	GCN 2nd gen			GCN 3rd gen	GCN 5th gen			RDNA 2
GPU instruction set			TeraScale instruction set			GCN instruction set								RDNA instruction set			TeraScale instruction set	GCN instruction set							RDNA instruction set
Max stock GPU base clock (MHz)			600	800	844	866		1108		1250	1400	2100		2400	400		538	600	?	847	900	1200	600	1300	1900
Max stock GPU base GFLOPS (Note: Single-precision performance is calculated from the base (or boost) core clock speed based on a FMA operation.)			480	614.4	648.1	886.7		1134.5		1760	1971.2	2150.4		3686.4	102.4		86	?	?	?	345.6	460.8	230.4	1331.2	486.4
3D engine (Note: Unified shaders : texture mapping units : render output units)			Up to 400:20:8	Up to 384:24:6		Up to 512:32:8				Up to 704:44:16		Up to 512:32:8		768:48:8	128:8:4		80:8:4	128:8:4			Up to 192:12:8	Up to 192:12:4	192:12:4	Up to 512:?:?	128:?:?
3D engine			IOMMUv1			IOMMUv2											IOMMUv1		?		IOMMUv2				
Video decoder			UVD 3.0			UVD 4.2		UVD 6.0		VCN 1.0		VCN 2.1	VCN 2.2	VCN 3.1		?	UVD 3.0	UVD 4.0	UVD 4.2		UVD 6.2	VCN 1.0			VCN 3.1
Video encoder			—N/a	VCE 1.0		VCE 2.0		VCE 3.1		VCN 1.0		VCN 2.1	VCN 2.2	VCN 3.1		?	—N/a	VCE 2.0			VCE 3.4	VCN 1.0			VCN 3.1
AMD Fluid Motion			No			Yes				No							No		Yes			No			
GPU power saving			PowerPlay	PowerTune													PowerPlay	PowerTune							
TrueAudio			—N/a			Yes							?				—N/a	Yes							
FreeSync			—N/a			1; 2											—N/a	1; 2							
HDCP (Note: To play protected video content, it also requires card, operating system, driver, and application support. A compatible HDCP display is also needed for this. HDCP is mandatory for the output of certain audio formats, placing additional constraints on the multimedia setup.)			?			1.4				2.2				2.3			?	1.4				2.2			2.3
PlayReady			—N/a							3.0 not yet							—N/a					3.0 not yet			
Supported displays (Note: To feed more than two displays, the additional panels must have native DisplayPort support. Alternatively active DisplayPort-to-DVI/HDMI/VGA adapters can be employed.)			2–3	2–4				3		3 (desktop); 4 (mobile, embedded)		4					2				3	4		4	
/drm/radeon (Note: DRM (Direct Rendering Manager) is a component of the Linux kernel. Support in this table refers to the most current version.)			Yes						—N/a								Yes				—N/a				
/drm/amdgpu			—N/a			Yes											—N/a	Yes							

== Processors ==
=== APU lines ===
1. Kaveri A-series APU
  - Desktop budget and mainstream markets (FM2+): The Trinity / Richland APU line was replaced in January 2014 by the Kaveri APU line, as the third generation of A10, A8, A6 and A4 series for the desktop market. Top-of-the-line model in 2014 was the quad-core A10-7850K APU, with a 3.7 GHz core frequency and 4 MB L2 cache, incorporating a 720 MHz GPU with 512 stream processors and over 856 GFLOPS of total processing power.
    In 2015 and 2016 new models with two to four enhanced Steamroller B cores were released as Kaveri-refresh / Godavari. A10-7890K, the new top-of-the-line model, features an increased core frequency of 4.1 GHz and an 866 MHz GPU.
  - Two or four CPU cores based on the Steamroller microarchitecture
  - Socket FM2+-only, Socket FM2 is not supported, support for PCIe 3.0
  - DDR3 Dual-channel (2x64-bit) memory controller
  - AMD Heterogeneous System Architecture (HSA) 2.0
  - SIP blocks: Unified Video Decoder, Video Coding Engine, TrueAudio
  - Three to eight Compute Units (CUs) based on the revised GCN 2nd gen microarchitecture; 1 Compute Unit (CU) consists of 64 Unified Shader Processors : 4 Texture Mapping Units (TMUs) : 1 Render Output Unit (ROP)
  - AMD Eyefinity up to 4 monitors, 4K Ultra HD support, DisplayPort 1.2 Support
  - Select models support AMD Hybrid Graphics by using a Radeon R7 240 or R7 250 discrete graphics card.
  - Integrated custom ARM Cortex-A5 co-processor with TrustZone Security Extensions
2. Berlin APU - canceled
  - Announced in 2013 by AMD, the Berlin APU was targeted at the enterprise and server markets featuring four Steamroller cores, up to 512 stream processors and support for ECC memory.

=== FX lines (discontinued) ===
In November 2013 AMD confirmed it would not update the FX series in 2014, neither its Socket AM3+ version, nor will it receive a Steamroller version with a new socket.

AMD however, released a Kaveri based FX-770K for desktop and FX-7600P for mobile which are basically APUs with their integrated graphics disabled similar to the Athlon X4 FM2+ line. Those APUs were released for OEMs only.

=== Server lines (canceled) ===
AMD's server roadmaps for 2014 showed:

- Berlin APU - quad-core x86 Steamroller architecture (as described above) for 1 Processor (1P) compute and media clusters
- Berlin CPU - quad-core x86 Steamroller architecture for 1P web and enterprise services clusters
- Seattle CPU - 4/8 core AArch64 Cortex-A57 architecture (Opteron A1100) for 1P web and enterprise services clusters
- Warsaw CPU - up to 16 core x86 Piledriver (2nd gen Bulldozer) architecture (Opteron 6338P and 6370P) for 2P/4P servers

However, plans for Steamroller Opteron products were cancelled, likely due to the poor energy efficiency achieved in this generation of the Bulldozer architecture. Energy efficiency was greatly increased in the following generation, Excavator, which exceeded Jaguar in performance per watt, and approximately doubled performance/watt over Steamroller (for example 20.74 pt/W vs 10.85 pt/W when comparing similar mobile APUs using rough arbitrary metrics).

Turion / ULV		Node range label	x86			
Microarchi.	Step	Node range label	Microarchi.	Step		
		180 nm	K7	Athlon Classic		
		180 nm	K7	Thunderbird		
		180 nm	K7	Palomino		
		130 nm	K7	Thoroughbred		
		130 nm	K7	Barton/Thorton		
		130 nm	K8	ClawHammer		
		130 nm	K8	Newcastle		
		130 nm	K8	SledgeHammer		
K8L	Lancaster	90 nm	K8	Winchester	K8(×2)	K9
K8L	Richmond	90 nm	K8	San Diego	Toledo	~~Greyhound~~
K8L	Taylor / Trinidad	90 nm	K8	San Diego	Windsor	
K8L	Tyler	65 nm	K8	Orleans	Brisbane	
K8L	Lion	65 nm	K10	Phenom	4 cores on mainstream desktop, DDR3 introduced	
K8L	Caspian	45 nm	K10	Phenom II / Athlon II	6 cores on mainstream desktop	
14h	Bobcat	40 nm				
		32 nm	K10	Lynx		
		32 nm	K10	Llano	APU introduced; CPU and GPU on single die	
		32 nm	Bulldozer 15h	Bulldozer	8 cores on mainstream desktop	
		32 nm	Bulldozer 15h	Piledriver		
16h	Jaguar	28 nm	Bulldozer 15h	Steamroller	APU/mobile-only	
16h	Puma	28 nm	Bulldozer 15h	Excavator	APU/mobile-only, DDR4 introduced	
K12	~~K12 (ARM64)~~	14 nm	Zen	Zen	SMT introduced	
		12 nm	Zen	Zen+		
		7 nm	Zen	Zen 2	12 and 16 cores on mainstream desktop, chiplet design	
		7 nm	Zen	Zen 3	3D V-Cache variants introduced	
		6 nm	Zen	Zen 3+	Mobile-only, DDR5 introduced	
		5 nm / 4 nm	Zen	Zen 4	High core density "Cloud" (Zen xc) variants introduced	
		4 nm / 3 nm	Zen	Zen 5	Ryzen AI NPU cores introduced	
		3 nm / 2 nm	Zen	Zen 6		
		16A / 14A	Zen	Zen 7		
