= Socket FS1 =

CPU socket for laptop AMD CPUs

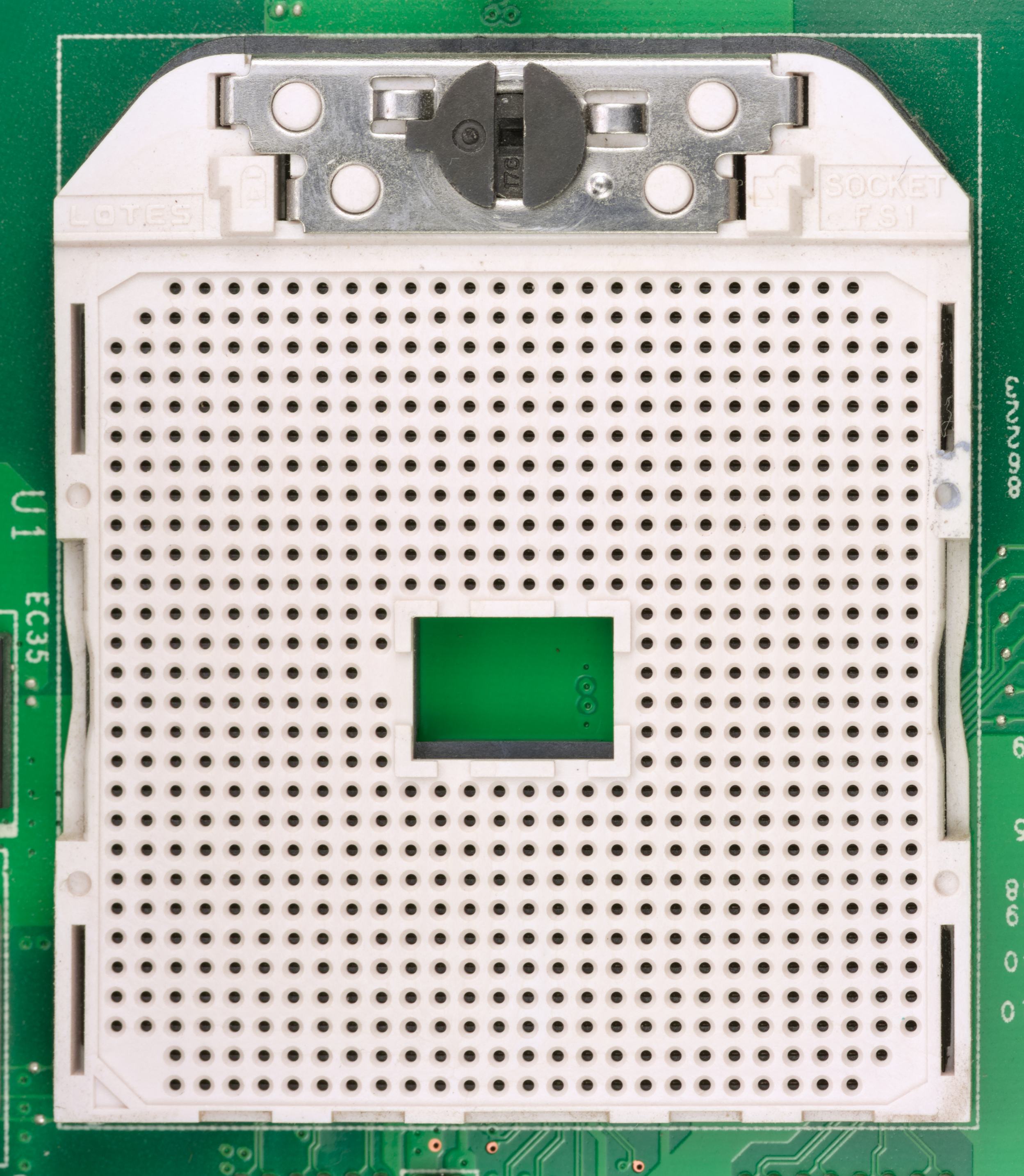
- Type: PGA-ZIF
- Chip form factors: ?
- Contacts: 722
- FSB protocol: HyperTransport 3.x
- FSB frequency: 200 MHz System clock HyperTransport up to 3.2 GHz
- Voltage range: ?
- Processors: mobile APU products (Llano, Trinity and Richland)
- Predecessor: Socket S1
- This article is part of the CPU socket series

The Socket FS1 is for notebooks using AMD APU processors codenamed Llano, Trinity and Richland (Socket FS1r2).

"Llano"-branded products combine K10 with Cedar (VLIW5), UVD 3 video acceleration and AMD Eyefinity-based multi-monitor support of up to three DisplayPort monitors.

"Trinity"- and "Richland"-branded products Piledriver with Northern Islands (VLIW4), UVD 3 and VCE 1 video acceleration and AMD Eyefinity-based multi-monitor support of up to four DisplayPort monitors.

While the AMD desktop CPUs are available in a 722-pin package Socket AM1 (FS1b), it is not clear whether these desktop CPUs will be compatible with Socket FS1 or vice versa.

It is the last pin grid array socket for AMD's mobile processors - all mobile processors in microarchitectures succeeding Piledriver are exclusively available in BGA packaging, for example Steamroller-based mobile processors uses Socket FP3 socket, which is a μBGA socket. Intel also adopted same practice, starting with Broadwell microarchitecture.

== Feature overview for AMD APUs ==
The following table shows features of AMD's processors with 3D graphics, including APUs (see also: List of AMD processors with 3D graphics).

| Platform | | | High, standard and low power | | | | | | | | | | | | | | Low and ultra-low power | | | | | | | | |
| Codename | Server | Basic | | | | | | Toronto | | | | | | | | | | | | | | | | | |
| Codename | Server | Micro | | | | | | | | | | | | | | | | Kyoto | | | | | | | |
| Codename | Desktop | Performance | | | | | | | | | | | | | Raphael | Phoenix | | | | | | | | | |
| Codename | Desktop | Mainstream | Llano | Trinity | Richland | Kaveri | Kaveri Refresh (Godavari) | Carrizo | Bristol Ridge | Raven Ridge | Picasso | Renoir | Cezanne | | Raphael | Phoenix | | | | | | | | | |
| Codename | Desktop | Entry | Llano | Trinity | Richland | Kaveri | Kaveri Refresh (Godavari) | Carrizo | Bristol Ridge | Raven Ridge | Picasso | Renoir | Cezanne | | | Phoenix | | | | | | | | | |
| Codename | Desktop | Basic | | | | | | | | | | | | | | | | Kabini | | | | Dalí | | | |
| Codename | Mobile | Performance | | | | | | | | | | Renoir | Cezanne | Rembrandt | Dragon Range | | | | | | | | | | |
| Codename | Mobile | Mainstream | Llano | Trinity | Richland | Kaveri | | Carrizo | Bristol Ridge | Raven Ridge | Picasso | Renoir Lucienne | Cezanne Barceló | Rembrandt | Dragon Range | Phoenix | | | | | | | | | |
| Codename | Mobile | Entry | Llano | Trinity | Richland | Kaveri | | Carrizo | Bristol Ridge | Raven Ridge | | | | | | | | | | | | Dalí | | | Mendocino |
| Codename | Mobile | Basic | | | | | | | | | | | | | | | Desna, Ontario, Zacate | Kabini, Temash | Beema, Mullins | Carrizo-L | Stoney Ridge | Dalí | Pollock | | Mendocino |
| Codename | Embedded | | | Trinity | | Bald Eagle | | Merlin Falcon, Brown Falcon | | Great Horned Owl | | Grey Hawk | | | | | Ontario, Zacate | Kabini | Steppe Eagle, Crowned Eagle, LX-Family | | Prairie Falcon | Banded Kestrel | | River Hawk | |
|---|---|---|---|---|---|---|---|---|---|---|---|---|---|---|---|---|---|---|---|---|---|---|---|---|---|
| Released | | | Aug 2011 | Oct 2012 | Jun 2013 | Jan 2014 | 2015 | Jun 2015 | Jun 2016 | Oct 2017 | Jan 2019 | Mar 2020 | Jan 2021 | Jan 2022 | Sep 2022 | Jan 2023 | Jan 2011 | May 2013 | Apr 2014 | May 2015 | Feb 2016 | Apr 2019 | Jul 2020 | Jun 2022 | Nov 2022 |
| CPU microarchitecture | | | K10 | Piledriver | | Steamroller | | Excavator | "Excavator+" | Zen | Zen+ | Zen 2 | Zen 3 | Zen 3+ | Zen 4 | | Bobcat | Jaguar | Puma | Puma+ | "Excavator+" | Zen | | Zen+ | "Zen 2+" |
| ISA | | | x86-64 v1 | x86-64 v2 | | | | x86-64 v3 | | | | | | | x86-64 v4 | | x86-64 v1 | x86-64 v2 | | | x86-64 v3 | | | | |
| Socket | Desktop | Performance | — | | | | | | | | | | | | AM5 | — | — | | | | | | | | |
| Socket | Desktop | Mainstream | — | | | | | AM4 | | | | | | — | AM5 | — | — | | | | | | | | |
| Socket | Desktop | Entry | FM1 | FM2 | | FM2+ | | FM2+ (Note: For FM2+ Excavator models: A8-7680, A6-7480 & Athlon X4 845.), AM4 | AM4 | | | | | — | | | — | | | | | | | | |
| Socket | Desktop | Basic | — | | | | | | | | | | | | | | — | AM1 | — | | | FP5 | — | | |
| Socket | Other | | FS1 | FS1+, FP2 | | FP3 | | FP4 | | FP5 | | FP6 | | FP7 | FL1 | FP7; FP7r2; FP8 | FT1 | FT3 | FT3b | | FP4 | FP5 | FT5 | FP5 | FT6 |
| PCI Express version | | | 2.0 | | | 3.0 | | | | | | | | 4.0 | 5.0 | 4.0 | 2.0 | | | | 3.0 | | | | |
| CXL | | | — | | | | | | | | | | | | | | — | | | | | | | | |
| Fab. (nm) | | | GF 32SHP (HKMG SOI) | | | GF 28SHP (HKMG bulk) | | | | GF 14LPP (FinFET bulk) | GF 12LP (FinFET bulk) | TSMC N7 (FinFET bulk) | | TSMC N6 (FinFET bulk) | CCD: TSMC N5 (FinFET bulk) cIOD: TSMC N6 (FinFET bulk) | TSMC 4nm (FinFET bulk) | TSMC N40 (bulk) | TSMC N28 (HKMG bulk) | GF 28SHP (HKMG bulk) | | | GF 14LPP (FinFET bulk) | | GF 12LP (FinFET bulk) | TSMC N6 (FinFET bulk) |
| Die area (mm^{2}) | | | 228 | 246 | | 245 | | 245 | 250 | 210 | | 156 | 180 | 210 | CCD: (2x) 70 cIOD: 122 | 178 | 75 (+ 28 FCH) | 107 | | ? | 125 | 149 | | | ~100 |
| Min TDP (W) | | | 35 | 17 | | | | 12 | | | | 10 | | 15 | 65 | 35 | 4.5 | 4 | 3.95 | 10 | 6 | | | 12 | 8 |
| Max APU TDP (W) | | | 100 | | | 95 | | 65 | | | | | | 45 | 170 | 54 | 18 | 25 | | | | | 6 | 54 | 15 |
| Max stock APU base clock (GHz) | | | 3 | 3.8 | 4.1 | 4.1 | | 3.7 | 3.8 | 3.6 | 3.7 | 3.8 | 4.0 | 3.3 | 4.7 | 4.3 | 1.75 | 2.2 | 2 | 2.2 | 3.2 | 2.6 | 1.2 | 3.35 | 2.8 |
| Max APUs per node (Note: A PC would be one node.) | | | 1 | | | | | | | | | | | | | | 1 | | | | | | | | |
| Max core dies per CPU | | | 1 | | | | | | | | | | | | 2 | 1 | 1 | | | | | | | | |
| Max CCX per core die | | | 1 | | | | | | | | | 2 | 1 | | | | 1 | | | | | | | | |
| Max cores per CCX | | | 4 | | | | | | | | | | 8 | | | | 2 | 4 | | | 2 | | | 4 | |
| Max CPU (Note: An APU combines a CPU and a GPU. Both have cores.) cores per APU | | | 4 | | | | | | | | | 8 | | | 16 | 8 | 2 | 4 | | | 2 | | | 4 | |
| Max threads per CPU core | | | 1 | | | | | | | 2 | | | | | | | 1 | | | | | 2 | | | |
| Integer pipeline structure | | | 3+3 | 2+2 | | | | | | 4+2 | | 4+2+1 | 1+3+3+1+2 | | | | 1+1+1+1 | | | | 2+2 | 4+2 | | | 4+2+1 |
| i386, i486, i586, CMOV, NOPL, i686, PAE, NX bit, CMPXCHG16B, AMD-V, RVI, ABM, and 64-bit LAHF/SAHF | | | Yes | | | | | | | | | | | | | | Yes | | | | | | | | |
| IOMMU (Note: Requires firmware support.) | | | — | v2 | | | | | | | | | | | | | v1 | | v2 | | | | | | |
| BMI1, AES-NI, CLMUL, and F16C | | | — | Yes | | | | | | | | | | | | | — | Yes | | | | | | | |
| MOVBE | | | — | | | | | Yes | | | | | | | | | — | Yes | | | | | | | |
| AVIC, BMI2, RDRAND, and MWAITX/MONITORX | | | — | | | | | Yes | | | | | | | | | — | | | | Yes | | | | |
| SME (Note: Requires firmware support.), TSME, ADX, SHA, RDSEED, SMAP, SMEP, XSAVEC, XSAVES, XRSTORS, CLFLUSHOPT, CLZERO, and PTE Coalescing | | | — | | | | | | | Yes | | | | | | | — | | | | | Yes | | | |
| GMET, WBNOINVD, CLWB, QOS, PQE-BW, RDPID, RDPRU, and MCOMMIT | | | — | | | | | | | | | Yes | | | | | — | | | | | | | | Yes |
| MPK, VAES | | | — | | | | | | | | | | Yes | | | | — | | | | | | | | |
| SGX | | | — | | | | | | | | | | | | | | — | | | | | | | | |
| FPUs per core | | | 1 | 0.5 | | | | | | 1 | | | | | | | 1 | | | | 0.5 | 1 | | | |
| Pipes per FPU | | | 2 | | | | | | | | | | | | | | 2 | | | | | | | | |
| FPU pipe width | | | 128-bit | | | | | | | | | 256-bit | | | | | 80-bit | 128-bit | | | | | | | 256-bit |
| CPU instruction set SIMD level | | | SSE4a (Note: No SSE4. No SSSE3.) | AVX | | | | AVX2 | | | | | | | AVX-512 | | SSSE3 | AVX | | | AVX2 | | | | |
| 3DNow! | | | 3DNow!+ | — | | | | | | | | | | | | | — | | | | | | | | |
| PREFETCH/PREFETCHW | | | Yes | | | | | | | | | | | | | | Yes | | | | | | | | |
| GFNI | | | — | | | | | | | | | | | | Yes | | — | | | | | | | | |
| AMX | | | — | | | | | | | | | | | | | | — | | | | | | | | |
| FMA4, LWP, TBM, and XOP | | | — | Yes | | | | | | — | | | | | | | — | | | | Yes | — | | | |
| FMA3 | | | — | Yes | | | | | | | | | | | | | — | | | | Yes | | | | |
| AMD XDNA | | | — | | | | | | | | | | | | | Yes | — | | | | | | | | |
| L1 data cache per core (KiB) | | | 64 | 16 | | | | 32 | | | | | | | | | 32 | | | | | | | | |
| L1 data cache associativity (ways) | | | 2 | 4 | | | | 8 | | | | | | | | | 8 | | | | | | | | |
| L1 instruction caches per core | | | 1 | 0.5 | | | | | | 1 | | | | | | | 1 | | | | 0.5 | 1 | | | |
| Max APU total L1 instruction cache (KiB) | | | 256 | 128 | | 192 | | | | 256 | | | | | 512 | 256 | 64 | | 128 | | 96 | 128 | | | |
| L1 instruction cache associativity (ways) | | | 2 | | | 3 | | | | 4 | | 8 | | | | | 2 | | | | 3 | 4 | | | 8 |
| L2 caches per core | | | 1 | 0.5 | | | | | | 1 | | | | | | | 1 | | | | 0.5 | 1 | | | |
| Max APU total L2 cache (MiB) | | | 4 | | | | | 2 | | | | 4 | | | 16 | | 1 | 2 | | | 1 | | | 2 | |
| L2 cache associativity (ways) | | | 16 | | | | | | | 8 | | | | | | | 16 | | | | | 8 | | | |
| Max on-die L3 cache per CCX (MiB) | | | — | | | | | | | 4 | | | 16 | | 32 | | — | | | | | | 4 | | |
| Max 3D V-Cache per CCD (MiB) | | | — | | | | | | | — | | | | | 64 | — | — | | | | | | — | | |
| Max total in-CCD L3 cache per APU (MiB) | | | — | | | | | | | 4 | | 8 | 16 | | 64 | | — | | | | | | 4 | | |
| Max. total 3D V-Cache per APU (MiB) | | | — | | | | | | | — | | | | | 64 | — | — | | | | | | — | | |
| Max. board L3 cache per APU (MiB) | | | — | | | | | | | — | | | | | | | — | | | | | | — | | |
| Max total L3 cache per APU (MiB) | | | — | | | | | | | 4 | | 8 | 16 | | 128 | | — | | | | | | 4 | | |
| APU L3 cache associativity (ways) | | | — | | | | | | | 16 | | | | | | | — | | | | | | 16 | | |
| L3 cache scheme | | | — | | | | | | | Victim | | | | | | | — | | | | | | Victim | | |
| Max. L4 cache | | | — | | | | | | | | | | | | | | — | | | | | | | | |
| Max stock DRAM support | | | DDR3-1866 | | DDR3-2133 | | | DDR3-2133, DDR4-2400 | DDR4-2400 | DDR4-2933 | | DDR4-3200, LPDDR4-4266 | | DDR5-4800, LPDDR5-6400 | DDR5-5200 | DDR5-5600, LPDDR5x-7500 | DDR3L-1333 | DDR3L-1600 | DDR3L-1866 | | DDR3-1866, DDR4-2400 | DDR4-2400 | DDR4-1600 | DDR4-3200 | LPDDR5-5500 |
| Max DRAM channels per APU | | | 2 | | | | | | | | | | | | | | 1 | | | | | 2 | 1 | 2 | |
| Max stock DRAM bandwidth (GB/s) per APU | | | 29.866 | | 34.132 | | | 38.400 | | 46.932 | | 68.256 | | 102.400 | 83.200 | 120.000 | 10.666 | 12.800 | 14.933 | | 19.200 | 38.400 | 12.800 | 51.200 | 88.000 |
| GPU microarchitecture | | | TeraScale 2 (VLIW5) | TeraScale 3 (VLIW4) | | GCN 2nd gen | | GCN 3rd gen | | GCN 5th gen | | | | RDNA 2 | | RDNA 3 | TeraScale 2 (VLIW5) | GCN 2nd gen | | | GCN 3rd gen | GCN 5th gen | | | RDNA 2 |
| GPU instruction set | | | TeraScale instruction set | | | GCN instruction set | | | | | | | | RDNA instruction set | | | TeraScale instruction set | GCN instruction set | | | | | | | RDNA instruction set |
| Max stock GPU base clock (MHz) | | | 600 | 800 | 844 | 866 | | 1108 | | 1250 | 1400 | 2100 | | 2400 | 400 | | 538 | 600 | ? | 847 | 900 | 1200 | 600 | 1300 | 1900 |
| Max stock GPU base GFLOPS (Note: Single-precision performance is calculated from the base (or boost) core clock speed based on a FMA operation.) | | | 480 | 614.4 | 648.1 | 886.7 | | 1134.5 | | 1760 | 1971.2 | 2150.4 | | 3686.4 | 102.4 | | 86 | ? | ? | ? | 345.6 | 460.8 | 230.4 | 1331.2 | 486.4 |
| 3D engine (Note: Unified shaders : texture mapping units : render output units) | | | Up to 400:20:8 | Up to 384:24:6 | | Up to 512:32:8 | | | | Up to 704:44:16 | | Up to 512:32:8 | | 768:48:8 | 128:8:4 | | 80:8:4 | 128:8:4 | | | Up to 192:12:8 | Up to 192:12:4 | 192:12:4 | Up to 512:?:? | 128:?:? |
| 3D engine | | | IOMMUv1 | | | IOMMUv2 | | | | | | | | | | | IOMMUv1 | | ? | | IOMMUv2 | | | | |
| Video decoder | | | UVD 3.0 | | | UVD 4.2 | | UVD 6.0 | | VCN 1.0 | | VCN 2.1 | VCN 2.2 | VCN 3.1 | | ? | UVD 3.0 | UVD 4.0 | UVD 4.2 | | UVD 6.2 | VCN 1.0 | | | VCN 3.1 |
| Video encoder | | | — | VCE 1.0 | | VCE 2.0 | | VCE 3.1 | | VCN 1.0 | | VCN 2.1 | VCN 2.2 | VCN 3.1 | | ? | — | VCE 2.0 | | | VCE 3.4 | VCN 1.0 | | | VCN 3.1 |
| AMD Fluid Motion | | | No | | | Yes | | | | No | | | | | | | No | | Yes | | | No | | | |
| GPU power saving | | | PowerPlay | PowerTune | | | | | | | | | | | | | PowerPlay | PowerTune | | | | | | | |
| TrueAudio | | | — | | | Yes | | | | | | | ? | | | | — | Yes | | | | | | | |
| FreeSync | | | — | | | 1; 2 | | | | | | | | | | | — | 1; 2 | | | | | | | |
| HDCP (Note: To play protected video content, it also requires card, operating system, driver, and application support. A compatible HDCP display is also needed for this. HDCP is mandatory for the output of certain audio formats, placing additional constraints on the multimedia setup.) | | | ? | | | 1.4 | | | | 2.2 | | | | 2.3 | | | ? | 1.4 | | | | 2.2 | | | 2.3 |
| PlayReady | | | — | | | | | | | 3.0 not yet | | | | | | | — | | | | | 3.0 not yet | | | |
| Supported displays (Note: To feed more than two displays, the additional panels must have native DisplayPort support. Alternatively active DisplayPort-to-DVI/HDMI/VGA adapters can be employed.) | | | 2–3 | 2–4 | | | | 3 | | 3 (desktop); 4 (mobile, embedded) | | 4 | | | | | 2 | | | | 3 | 4 | | 4 | |
| /drm/radeon (Note: DRM (Direct Rendering Manager) is a component of the Linux kernel. Support in this table refers to the most current version.) | | | Yes | | | | | | — | | | | | | | | Yes | | | | — | | | | |
| /drm/amdgpu | | | — | | | Yes | | | | | | | | | | | — | Yes | | | | | | | |

== See also ==
- List of AMD processors with 3D graphics
- List of AMD mobile processors
