= Socket FMx =

Socket FMx may refer to:

- Socket FM1
- Socket FM2
- Socket FM2+
