= Socket AM1 =

CPU socket for AMD Athlon low-cost processors

- Release date: April 2014
- Type: PGA-ZIF
- Chip form factors: Flip-chip
- Contacts: 721
- FSB protocol: PCI Express
- Voltage range: 1.4V
- Processor dimensions: 35mm × 35mm 1,225mm^{2}
- Processors: Desktop APU products Jaguar- and Puma-based (Athlon- and Sempron-SoCs)
- Predecessor: FM2+
- Successor: AM4
- Memory support: DDR3
- This article is part of the CPU socket series

Socket AM1 is a socket designed by AMD, launched in April 2014 for desktop SoCs in the value segment. Socket AM1 is intended for a class of CPUs that contain both an integrated GPU and a chipset, essentially forming a complete SoC implementation, and as such has pins for display, PCI Express, SATA, and other I/O interfaces directly in the socket. AMD's first compatible CPUs, designated as APUs, are 4 socketable chips in the Kabini family of the Jaguar microarchitecture, marketed under the Athlon and Sempron names and announced on April 9, 2014. Socket AM1 was initially branded as Socket FS1b before its release.

The brand names are Athlon and Sempron. The underlying microarchitectures are Jaguar and Puma. All products are SoCs, this means the Chipset is on the die of the APU and not on the motherboard.

While the AMD mobile CPUs are available in a 722-pin package Socket FS1, it is not clear whether these notebook CPUs are compatible with Socket AM1 or vice versa.

Its mobile counterpart is Socket FT3 (BGA-769).

At least one board is supported by coreboot.

== Products ==
=== APUs ===
- Codenamed: Kabini
- Fabrication process: GlobalFoundries 28 nm
- L1 cache: 64 KB (32 KB data + 32 KB instruction) per core
- Integrated graphics: 2nd generation Graphics Core Next (GCN)

Brand	Model	CPU					GPU			PCIe lanes	Memory support	TDP	Release date	Price (USD)
Brand	Model	Cores (threads)	Clock rate (GHz)		Cache		Model	Config (Note: Unified shaders : Texture mapping units : Render output units and Compute units (CU))	Clock (GHz)	PCIe lanes	Memory support	TDP	Release date	Price (USD)
Brand	Model	Cores (threads)	Base	Boost	L1	L2	Model	Config	Clock (GHz)	PCIe lanes	Memory support	TDP	Release date	Price (USD)
Sempron	2650	2 (2)	1.45	—	128 KB	1 MB	Radeon R3; Graphics	128:8:4; 2 CU	0.40	4 PCIe 2.0	DDR3-1333 single-channel	25 W	Apr 9, 2014	$34
Sempron	3850	4 (4)	1.30	—	256 KB	2 MB	Radeon R3; Graphics	128:8:4; 2 CU	0.45	4 PCIe 2.0	DDR3-1600 single-channel	25 W	Apr 9, 2014	$39
Athlon	5150	4 (4)	1.60	—	256 KB	2 MB	Radeon R3; Graphics	128:8:4; 2 CU	0.60	4 PCIe 2.0	DDR3-1600 single-channel	25 W	Apr 9, 2014	$49
Athlon	5350	4 (4)	2.05	—	256 KB	2 MB	Radeon R3; Graphics	128:8:4; 2 CU	0.60	4 PCIe 2.0	DDR3-1600 single-channel	25 W	Apr 9, 2014	$59
Athlon	5370	4 (4)	2.20	—	256 KB	2 MB	Radeon R3; Graphics	128:8:4; 2 CU	0.60	4 PCIe 2.0	DDR3-1600 single-channel	25 W	Apr 9, 2014	OEM

== See also ==
- List of AMD processors with 3D graphics
- List of AMD mobile microprocessors
