= Unified Media Interface =

The Unified Media Interface (UMI) interconnect is the link between an AMD Accelerated Processing Unit (APU) and the FCH (Fusion Controller Hub). It is similar to Intel's DMI, and is based on PCI Express. The Fusion Controller Hub is similar to the southbridge of earlier chipsets.
