= PlayReady =

Media copy prevention technology

PlayReady is a media file copy prevention technology from Microsoft that includes encryption, output prevention and digital rights management (DRM). It was announced in February 2008.

== Technological differences ==
The main differences relative to previous DRM schemes from Microsoft are:

- Some popular features that were already present in other DRM schemes in the market have been added. These include the concept of domain (group of devices belonging to the same user which can share the same licenses), Embedded Licenses (licenses that are embedded in the content files, avoiding a separate step for license acquisition) and envelopes (the ability to DRM arbitrary, potentially non-media content). It is also the protection scheme for IIS Smooth Streaming, Microsoft's adaptive streaming technology.
- It is platform-independent: unlike other Microsoft DRM schemes like Janus, PlayReady can be ported to any kind of portable device, even if it uses non-Microsoft technology (OS, codecs, media player, etc.).

== Competitors ==
PlayReady competes with other proprietary DRM schemes and even more with DRM-free software, most notably Apple's FairPlay introduced in iTunes and QuickTime. There are several other DRM schemes that are competing to become the dominant DRM technology (e.g. Widevine).

== Versions ==
Microsoft released the first version of the PlayReady suite (Porting Kit for devices, PC SDK and runtime, Server SDK) in June 2008. Silverlight 2.0, released in October 2008, supports content restricted with PlayReady. As of Silverlight 4.0, the implementation of Microsoft PlayReady in Silverlight supports offline content (via persisted license), subscription scenarios (via chained licenses) and online, streaming-only content (via simple non-persistent licenses). Output protection support was also added in Silverlight 4.0.

Microsoft Edge browser in Microsoft Windows has support for PlayReady with EME.

== Interoperability ==
- PlayReady 2.9 and below is backwards compatible with Windows Media DRM 10 content, meaning that content encrypted with WM DRM 10 (for instance, content for PlaysForSure devices) will play on a PlayReady terminal.
- CopyEnablers and MoveEnablers are no longer supported by PlayReady 3.0 and above.
- PlaysForSure compliant devices won't play PlayReady-encrypted content.
