= Jaguar (microarchitecture) =

Computer processor microarchitecture by AMD

Jaguar - Family 16h
General information
- Launched: Mid-2013
- Discontinued: present
- Common manufacturer: AMD

Physical specifications
- Sockets: Socket AM1; Socket FT3 (BGA-769)

Cache
- L1 cache: 64 KB per core
- L2 cache: 1 MB to 2 MB shared

Architecture and classification
- Technology node: 28 nm
- Instruction set: AMD64 (x86-64-v2)

Products, models, variants
- Core names: Kabini; Temash; Kyoto; G-series; Athlon, Sempron, A4, A6, & E4

History
- Predecessor: Bobcat - Family 14h
- Successors: Puma - Family 16h (2nd-gen); CPU of Xbox One X

The AMD Jaguar Family 16h is a low-power microarchitecture designed by AMD. It is used in APUs succeeding the Bobcat Family microarchitecture in 2013 and being succeeded by AMD's Puma architecture in 2014. It is two-way superscalar and capable of out-of-order execution. It is used in AMD's Semi-Custom Business Unit as a design for custom processors and is used by AMD in four product families: Kabini aimed at notebooks and mini PCs, Temash aimed at tablets, Kyoto aimed at micro-servers, and the G-Series aimed at embedded applications. Both the PlayStation 4 and the Xbox One use SoCs based on the Jaguar microarchitecture, with more powerful GPUs than AMD sells in its own commercially available Jaguar APUs.

== Design ==
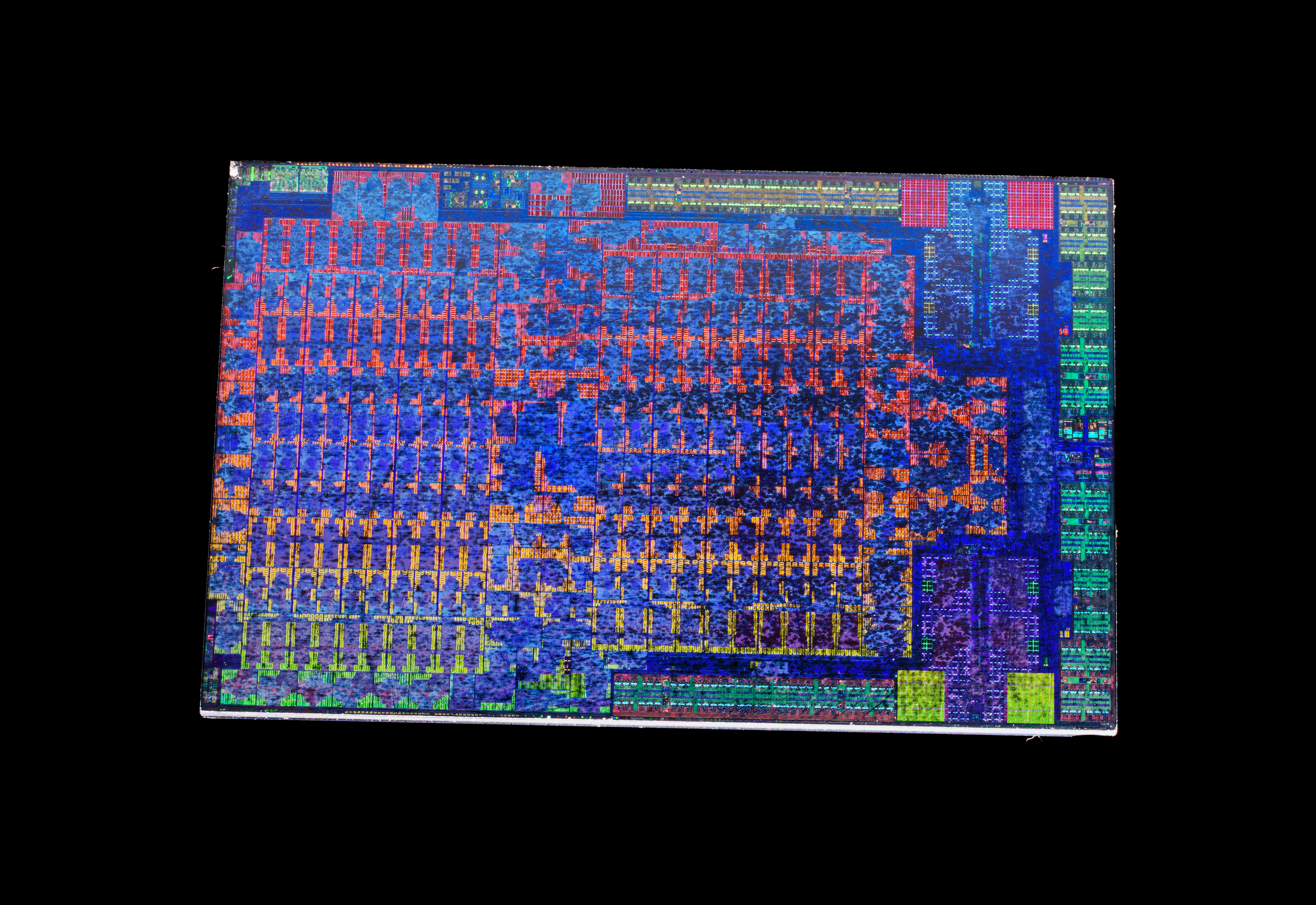
A die shot of a Jaguar processor used in a PlayStation 4 Pro

- 32 KiB instruction + 32 KiB data L1 cache per core, L1 cache includes parity error detection
- 16-way, 1–2 MiB unified L2 cache shared by two or four cores, L2 cache is protected from errors by the use of error correcting code
- Out-of-order execution and speculative execution
- Integrated memory controller
- Two-way integer execution
- Two-way 128-bit wide floating-point and packed integer execution
- Integer hardware divider
- Consumer processors support two DDR3L DIMMs in one channel at frequencies up to 1600 MHz
- Server processors support two DDR3 DIMMs in one channel at frequencies up to 1600 MHz with ECC
- As a SoC (not just an APU) it integrates Fusion controller hub
- Jaguar does not feature clustered multi-thread (CMT), meaning that execution resources are not shared between cores

=== Instruction-set support ===
The Jaguar core has support for the following instruction sets and instructions: MMX, SSE, SSE2, SSE3, SSSE3, SSE4a, SSE4.1, SSE4.2, AVX, F16C, CLMUL, AES, BMI1, MOVBE (Move Big-Endian instruction), XSAVE/XSAVEOPT, ABM (POPCNT/LZCNT), and AMD-V.

== Improvements over Bobcat ==
- Over 10% increase in clock frequency
- Over 15% improvement in instructions per clock (IPC)
- Added support for SSE4.1, SSE4.2, AES, CLMUL, MOVBE, AVX, F16C, BMI1
- Up to four CPU cores
- L2 cache is shared between cores
- FPU datapath width increased to 128-bit
- Added hardware integer divider
- Enhanced cache prefetchers
- Doubled bandwidth of load–store units
- C6 and CC6 low power states with lower entry and exit latency
- Smaller, 3.1 mm^{2} area per core
- Integrated Fusion controller hub (FCH)
- Video Coding Engine

== Processors ==
=== Consoles ===
Chip (device)	Release date	Fab	Die area (mm2)	CPU				GPU							Memory			Storage	API support	Special features	
Chip (device)	Release date	Fab	Die area (mm2)	Archi- tecture	Cores	Clock (GHz)	L2 cache	Archi- tecture	Core config (Note: Unified Shaders : Texture Mapping Units : Render Output Units)	Clock (MHz)	GFLOPS (Note: Precision performance is calculated from the base (or boost) core clock speed based on a FMA operation.)	Pixel fillrate (GP/s) (Note: Pixel fillrate is calculated as the number of ROPs multiplied by the base (or boost) core clock speed.)	Texture fillrate (GT/s) (Note: Texture fillrate is calculated as the number of TMUs multiplied by the base (or boost) core clock speed.)	Other	Size	Bus type & width	Band- width (GB/s)	Storage	API support	Audio	Other
Liverpool (PS4)	Nov 2013	28 nm	348	Jaguar	2 modules with 4 cores each	1.6	2× 2 MiB	GCN 2	1152:72:32; 18 CU	800	1843	25.6	57.6	8 ACEs	8 GiB	GDDR5; 256-bit	176	3DBD/DVD; 1× 2.5" SATA hard drive Easily replaceable hard drive USB 3.0	OpenGL 4.2, GNM, GNMX and PSSL	Dolby Atmos (BD); S/PDIF	PS VR; PS4 additional modules HDR10 (except discs) (Note: UHD BD is the only video disc format supporting HDR.); CEC; Optional IR sensor
Durango (Xbox One)	Nov 2013	28 nm	363	Jaguar	2 modules with 4 cores each	1.75	2× 2 MiB	GCN 2	768:48:16; 12 CU	853	1310	13.6	40.9	2 ACEs	32 MiB	ESRAM (Note: Cache)	204	3DBD/DVD/CD; 1× 2.5" SATA hard drive USB 3.0	Direct3D 11.2 and 12	Fully Dolby Atmos, DTS:X, and Windows Sonic; S/PDIF	Xbox One additional modules FreeSync (1); HDMI 1.4 through IR sensor and IR out port Kensington lock
Durango (Xbox One)	Nov 2013	28 nm	363	Jaguar	2 modules with 4 cores each	1.75	2× 2 MiB	GCN 2	768:48:16; 12 CU	853	1310	13.6	40.9	2 ACEs	8 GiB	DDR3; 256-bit	68	3DBD/DVD/CD; 1× 2.5" SATA hard drive USB 3.0	Direct3D 11.2 and 12	Fully Dolby Atmos, DTS:X, and Windows Sonic; S/PDIF	Xbox One additional modules FreeSync (1); HDMI 1.4 through IR sensor and IR out port Kensington lock
Edmonton (Xbox One S)	Jun 2016	16 nm	240	Jaguar	2 modules with 4 cores each	1.75	2× 2 MiB	GCN 2	768:48:16; 12 CU	914	1404	14.6	43.9	2 ACEs	32 MiB	ESRAM	219	4KBD/3DBD/DVD/CD (Note: "Digital" version does not have an optical drive.); 1× 2.5" SATA hard drive USB 3.0	Direct3D 11.2 and 12	Fully Dolby Atmos, DTS:X, and Windows Sonic; S/PDIF	Xbox One S additional modules Fully HDR10; Dolby Vision (streaming); FreeSync (1&2); HDMI 1.4 through IR sensor and IR out port Kensington lock
Edmonton (Xbox One S)	Jun 2016	16 nm	240	Jaguar	2 modules with 4 cores each	1.75	2× 2 MiB	GCN 2	768:48:16; 12 CU	914	1404	14.6	43.9	2 ACEs	8 GiB	DDR3; 256-bit	68	4KBD/3DBD/DVD/CD; 1× 2.5" SATA hard drive USB 3.0	Direct3D 11.2 and 12	Fully Dolby Atmos, DTS:X, and Windows Sonic; S/PDIF	Xbox One S additional modules Fully HDR10; Dolby Vision (streaming); FreeSync (1&2); HDMI 1.4 through IR sensor and IR out port Kensington lock
Liverpool? (PS4 Slim)	Sep 2016	16 nm	208	Jaguar	2 modules with 4 cores each	1.6	2× 2 MiB	GCN 2	1152:72:32; 18 CU	800	1843	25.6	57.6	8 ACEs	8 GiB	GDDR5; 256-bit	176	3DBD/DVD; 1× 2.5" SATA hard drive Easily replaceable hard drive USB 3.0	OpenGL 4.2, GNM, GNMX and PSSL	Dolby Atmos (BD)	PS VR; PS4 Slim additional modules HDR10 (except discs); CEC; Optional IR sensor
Neo (PS4 Pro)	Nov 2016	16 nm	325	Jaguar	2 modules with 4 cores each	2.13	2× 2 MiB	GCN 4 Polaris	2304:144:32; 36 CU	911	4198	58.3	131.2	4 ACEs and 2 HWS; Double-rate FP16 (Note: Feature preview of Rapid Packed Math, introduced in GCN 5 Vega.) checkerboard rendering	8 GiB	GDDR5; 256-bit	218	3DBD/DVD; 1× 2.5" SATA hard drive Easily replaceable hard drive USB 3.0	OpenGL 4.2 (4.5), GNM, GNMX and PSSL	Dolby Atmos (BD); S/PDIF	PS VR; PS4 Pro additional modules HDR10 (except discs); Up to 4K@60 Hz; CEC; Optional IR sensor
Neo (PS4 Pro)	Nov 2016	16 nm	325	Jaguar	2 modules with 4 cores each	2.13	2× 2 MiB	GCN 4 Polaris	2304:144:32; 36 CU	911	4198	58.3	131.2	4 ACEs and 2 HWS; Double-rate FP16 checkerboard rendering	1 GiB	DDR3 (Note: Swap)	?	3DBD/DVD; 1× 2.5" SATA hard drive Easily replaceable hard drive USB 3.0	OpenGL 4.2 (4.5), GNM, GNMX and PSSL	Dolby Atmos (BD); S/PDIF	PS VR; PS4 Pro additional modules HDR10 (except discs); Up to 4K@60 Hz; CEC; Optional IR sensor
Scorpio (Xbox One X)	Nov 2017	16 nm	359	Customized; Jaguar	2 modules with 4 cores each	2.3	2× 2 MiB	GCN 4 Polaris	2560:160:32; 40 CU	1172	6001	37.5	187.5	4 ACEs and 2 HWS	12 GiB	GDDR5; 384-bit	326	4KBD/3DBD/DVD/CD; 1× 2.5" SATA hard drive USB 3.0	Direct3D 11.2 and 12	Fully Dolby Atmos, DTS:X, and Windows Sonic; S/PDIF	Xbox One X additional modules Fully HDR10; Dolby Vision (streaming); FreeSync (1&2); Up to 4K@60 Hz; HDMI 1.4b through IR sensor and IR out port

=== Desktop ===
SoCs using Socket AM1:

Model	CPU			GPU			TDP (W)	DDR3 Memory Speed	Socket
Model	Cores	Freq. (GHz)	L2 Cache (MB)	Model	Cores (unified shaders : texture mapping units : render output units)	Freq. (MHz)	TDP (W)	DDR3 Memory Speed	Socket
Athlon 5370	4	2.2	2	Radeon R3	128:8:4	600	25	1600	AM1
Athlon 5350	4	2.05	2	Radeon R3	128:8:4	600	25	1600	AM1
Athlon 5150	4	1.6	2	Radeon R3	128:8:4	600	25	1600	AM1
Sempron 3850	4	1.3	2	Radeon R3	128:8:4	450	25	1600	AM1
Sempron 2650	2	1.45	1	Radeon R3	128:8:4	400	25	1333	AM1

=== Desktop/Mobile (28 nm) ===
Target segment	Model	CPU				GPU				TDP (W)	DDR3 Memory	Turbo Core
Target segment	Model	Cores	Freq. (GHz)	Turbo (GHz)	L2 Cache (MB)	Model	Config.	Freq. (MHz)	Turbo (MHz)	TDP (W)	DDR3 Memory	Turbo Core
Notebooks /Mini-PCs	A6-5200	4	2.0	—N/a	2	HD 8400	128:8:4	600	—N/a	25	(L)1600	No
Notebooks /Mini-PCs	A4-5100	4	1.55	—N/a	2	HD 8330	128:8:4	500	—N/a	15	(L)1600	No
Notebooks /Mini-PCs	A4-5000	4	1.50	—N/a	2	HD 8330	128:8:4	500	—N/a	15	(L)1600	No
Notebooks	E2-3000	2	1.65	—N/a	1	HD 8280	128:8:4	450	—N/a	15	(L)1600	No
Notebooks	E1-2500	2	1.4	—N/a	1	HD 8240	128:8:4	400	—N/a	15	(L)1333	No
Notebooks	E1-2100	2	1.0	—N/a	1	HD 8210	128:8:4	300	—N/a	9	(L)1333	No
Tablets	A6-1450	4	1.0	1.4	2	HD 8250	128:8:4	300	400	8	(L)1066	Yes
Tablets	A4-1350	4	1.0	—N/a	2	HD 8210	128:8:4	300	—N/a	8	1066	No
Tablets	A4-1250	2	1.0	—N/a	1	HD 8210	128:8:4	300	—N/a	8	(L)1333	No
Tablets	A4-1200	2	1.0	—N/a	1	HD 8180	128:8:4	225	—N/a	3.9	(L)1066	No

=== Server ===
==== Opteron X1100-series "Kyoto" (28 nm) ====
Model	Step.	CPU						Memory support	TDP (W)	Released	Part number	Release price (USD)
Model	Step.	Cores	Freq. (GHz)	Turbo	L2 Cache (MB)	Multi	V_{core}	Memory support	TDP (W)	Released	Part number	Release price (USD)
X1150	B0	4	2.0	—N/a	2			DDR3	17	May 2013	OX1150IPJ44HM	$64

==== Opteron X2100-series "Kyoto" (28 nm) ====
Model	Step.	CPU						GPU				DDR3 Memory support	TDP (W)	Released	Part number	Release price (USD)
Model	Step.	Cores	Freq. (GHz)	Turbo (GHz)	L2 Cache (MB)	Multi	V_{core}	Model	Config	Freq. (MHz)	Turbo	DDR3 Memory support	TDP (W)	Released	Part number	Release price (USD)
X2150	B0	4	1.9	—N/a	2			HD 8400		800	—N/a		22	May 2013	OX2150IAJ44HM	$99
X2170		4	2.4	—N/a	2			HD 8400		800	—N/a		25	September 2016	OX2170IXJ44JB	

=== Embedded ===
Model	CPU			GPU			TDP (W)	DDR3 ECC Memory Speed
Model	Cores	Freq. (GHz)	L2 Cache (MB)	Model	Config.	Freq. (MHz)	TDP (W)	DDR3 ECC Memory Speed
GX-420CA	4	2.0	2	HD 8400E	128:8:4	600	25	1600
GX-416RA	4	1.6	2	—N/a			15	1600
GX-415GA	4	1.5	2	HD 8330E	128:8:4	500	15	1600
GX-412TC	4	1.0	2	—N/a			6	1333
GX-411GA	4	1.1	2	HD 8210E	128:8:4	300	15	1600
GX-217GA	2	1.65	1	HD 8280E	128:8:4	450	15	1600
GX-210HA	2	1.0	1	HD 8210E	128:8:4	300	9	1333
GX-210JA	2	1.0	1	HD 8180E	128:8:4	225	6	1066

== Jaguar derivative and successor ==
In 2017, a derivative of the Jaguar microarchitecture was announced in the APU of Microsoft's Xbox One X (Project Scorpio) revision to the Xbox One. The Project Scorpio APU is described as a 'customized' derivative of the Jaguar microarchitecture, utilizing eight cores clocked at 2.3 GHz.

The Puma successor to Jaguar was released in 2014 and targeting entry level notebooks and tablets.
