= Puma (microarchitecture) =

Microarchitecture by AMD

Puma - Family 16h (2nd-gen)
General information
- Launched: mid-2014
- Discontinued: mid-2015
- Common manufacturer: AMD

Performance
- Max. CPU clock rate: 1.35 GHz to 2.5 GHz

Cache
- L1 cache: 64 KB per core
- L2 cache: 1 MB to 2 MB shared

Architecture and classification
- Technology node: 28 nm
- Instruction set: AMD64 (x86-64)

Physical specifications
- Cores: 2–4
- GPUs: Radeon RX: 128 cores, 300–800 Mhz
- Sockets: Socket AM1; Socket FT3b (BGA-769)

Products, models, variants
- Core names: Beema; Mullins
- Brand name: AMD APU

History
- Predecessor: Jaguar - Family 16h

The Puma Family 16h is a low-power microarchitecture by AMD for its APUs. It succeeds the Jaguar as a second-generation version, targets the same market, and belongs to the same AMD architecture Family 16h. The Beema line of processors are aimed at low-power notebooks, and Mullins are targeting the tablet sector.

== Design ==
The Puma cores use the same microarchitecture as Jaguar, and inherits the design:

- Out-of-order execution and Speculative execution, up to 4 CPU cores
- Two-way integer execution
- Two-way 128-bit wide floating-point and packed integer execution
- Integer hardware divider
- Puma does not feature clustered multi-thread (CMT), meaning that there are no "modules"
- Puma does not feature Heterogeneous System Architecture or zero-copy
- 32 KiB instruction + 32 KiB data L1 cache per core
- 1–2 MiB unified L2 cache shared by two or four cores
- Integrated single channel memory controller supporting 64bit DDR3L
- 3.1 mm^{2} area per core

=== Instruction set support ===
Like Jaguar, the Puma core has support for the following instruction sets and instructions: MMX, SSE, SSE2, SSE3, SSSE3, SSE4a, SSE4.1, SSE4.2, AVX, F16C, CLMUL, AES, BMI1, MOVBE (Move Big-Endian instruction), XSAVE/XSAVEOPT, ABM (POPCNT/LZCNT), and AMD-V.

=== Improvements over Jaguar ===
- 19% CPU core leakage reduction at 1.2V
- 38% GPU leakage reduction
- 500 mW reduction in memory controller power
- 200 mW reduction in display interface power
- Chassis temperature aware turbo boost
- Selective boosting according to application needs (intelligent boost)
- Support for ARM TrustZone via integrated Cortex-A5 processor
- Support for DDR3L-1866 memory

== Puma+ ==
AMD released a revision of the Puma microarchitecture, Puma+, which is integrated into the Carrizo-L APU platform.

== Features ==
APU features table

== Processors ==
=== Desktop/Mobile (Beema) ===
Family	Model	Socket	CPU				GPU			TDP (W)	DDR3L Memory Speed
Family	Model	Socket	Cores	Freq. (GHz)	Max. Turbo (GHz)	L2 Cache (MB)	Model	Config.	Max. Freq. (MHz)	TDP (W)	DDR3L Memory Speed
A8	6410	Socket FT3b	4	2.0	2.4	2	Radeon R5	128:?:?	800	15	1866
A6	6310	Socket FT3b	4	1.8	2.4	2	Radeon R4	128:?:?	800	15	1866
A4	6250J	Socket FT3b	4	2.0	—	2	Radeon R3	128:?:?	600	25	1600
A4	6210	Socket FT3b	4	1.8	—	2	Radeon R3	128:?:?	600	15	1600
E2	6110	Socket FT3b	4	1.5	—	2	Radeon R2	128:?:?	500	15	1600
E1	6010	Socket FT3b	2	1.35	—	1	Radeon R2	128:?:?	350	10	1333

=== Tablet (Mullins) ===
Family	Model	CPU				GPU			Power		DDR3L Memory Speed
Family	Model	Cores	Freq. (GHz)	Max. Turbo (GHz)	L2 Cache (MB)	Model	Config.	Max. Freq. (MHz)	TDP (W)	SDP (W)	DDR3L Memory Speed
A10 Micro	6700T	4	1.2	2.2	2	Radeon R6	128:?:?	500	4.5	2.8	1333
A6 Micro	6500T	4	1.2	1.8	2	Radeon R4	128:?:?	401	4.5	2.8	1333
A4 Micro	6400T	4	1.0	1.6	2	Radeon R3	128:?:?	350	4.5	2.8	1333
E1 Micro	6200T	2	1.0	1.4	1	Radeon R2	128:?:?	300	3.95	2.8	1066
