= List of AMD Opteron processors =

Opteron is a central processing unit (CPU) family within the AMD64 line. Designed by Advanced Micro Devices (AMD) for the server market, Opteron competed with Intel's Xeon. The Opteron family is succeeded by the Zen-based Epyc, and Ryzen Threadripper and Threadripper Pro series.

For Socket 940 and Socket 939 Opterons, each chip has a three-digit model number, in the form Opteron XYY. For Socket F and Socket AM2 Opterons, each chip has a four-digit model number, in the form Opteron XZYY. For all Opterons, the first digit (the X) specifies the number of CPUs on the target machine:

- 1 – has 1 processor (uniprocessor)
- 2 – has 2 processors (dual processor)
- 8 – has 4 or 8 processors

For Socket F and Socket AM2 Opterons, the second digit (the Z) represents the processor generation. Presently, only 2 (dual-core), DDR2, 3 (quad-core) and 4 (six-core) are used.

For all Opterons, the last two digits in the model number (the YY) indicate the clock rate (frequency) of a CPU, a higher number indicating a higher clock rate. This speed indication is comparable to processors of the same generation if they have the same amount of cores. Single-cores and dual-cores have different indications, despite sometimes having the same clock rate.

Model number methodology for the AMD Opteron 4000 and 6000 Series processors.
AMD Opteron processors are identified by a four digit model number, ZYXX, where:
Z – denotes product series

- 4000 Series = Low cost and power optimized 1- and 2-way servers
- 6000 Series = High performance 2- and 4-way servers

Y – denotes series generation

- 41xx = 1st generation of 4000 series
- 61xx = 1st generation of 6000 series

XX – communicates a change in product specifications within the series, and is not a relative measure of performance.

The suffix HE or EE denotes a high-efficiency or energy-efficiency model with a lower thermal design power (TDP) than a standard Opteron. The suffix SE denotes a top-of-the-line model with a higher TDP than a standard Opteron.

== Feature overview ==
=== APUs ===
APU features table

== K8 Opterons (Family 0Fh) ==
=== First Gen. Opterons (130 nm) ===
==== 100 series "SledgeHammer" ====
- All models support: MMX, SSE, SSE2, Enhanced 3DNow!, NX bit, AMD64
- All models with OPN ending in AG support up to Registered PC2700 DDR SDRAM
- All other models support up to Registered PC3200 DDR SDRAM
- All models only support single-processor configurations

Model number	Clock	L2 cache	HT	Voltage	TDP (W)	Socket	Release date	Memory support	Part number	Stepping	Release price
B3 & C0 & CG, Single core
140	1.4 GHz	1 MiB	800 MHz	1.55	84.7	940	30 June 2003	DDR-333	OSA140CCO5AG	B3	$229
140	1.4 GHz	1 MiB	800 MHz	1.50	82.1	940	9 September 2003	DDR-400	OSA140CEP5AK	C0	
140	1.4 GHz	1 MiB	800 MHz	1.50	82.1	940	18 May 2004	DDR-400	OSA140CEP5AT	CG	$163
142	1.6 GHz	1 MiB	800 MHz	1.55	84.7	940	30 June 2003	DDR-333	OSA142CCO5AG	B3	$292
142	1.6 GHz	1 MiB	800 MHz	1.50	82.1	940	9 September 2003	DDR-400	OSA142CEP5AK	C0	
142	1.6 GHz	1 MiB	800 MHz	1.50	82.1	940	18 May 2004	DDR-400	OSA142CEP5AT	CG	$178
144	1.8 GHz	1 MiB	800 MHz	1.55	84.7	940	30 June 2003	DDR-333	OSA144CCO5AG	B3	$438
144	1.8 GHz	1 MiB	800 MHz	1.50	82.1	940	9 September 2003	DDR-400	OSA144CEP5AK	C0	
144	1.8 GHz	1 MiB	800 MHz	1.50	82.1	940	18 May 2004	DDR-400	OSA144CEP5AT	CG	$218
146	2.0 GHz	1 MiB	800 MHz	1.50	89	940	9 September 2003	DDR-400	OSA146CEP5AK	C0	$669
146	2.0 GHz	1 MiB	800 MHz	1.50	89	940	18 May 2004	DDR-400	OSA146CEP5AT	CG	$278
148	2.2 GHz	1 MiB	800 MHz	1.50	89	940	17 November 2003	DDR-400	OSA148CEP5AK	C0	$733
148	2.2 GHz	1 MiB	800 MHz	1.50	89	940	18 May 2004	DDR-400	OSA148CEP5AT	CG	$417
150	2.4 GHz	1 MiB	800 MHz	1.50	89	940	18 May 2004	DDR-400	OSA150CEP5AT	CG	$637
CG, Single core, high-efficiency
146 HE	2.0 GHz	1 MiB	800 MHz	1.30	55	940	14 February 2004	DDR-400	OSK146CMP5AT	CG	$733
CG, Single core, energy-efficient
140 EE	1.4 GHz	1 MiB	800 MHz	1.15	30	940	14 February 2004	DDR-400	OSB140CSP5AT	CG	$733

==== 200 series "SledgeHammer" ====
- All models support: MMX, SSE, SSE2, Enhanced 3DNow!, NX bit, AMD64
- All models with OPN ending in AH support up to Registered PC2700 DDR SDRAM
- All other models support up to Registered PC3200 DDR SDRAM
- All models support up to two-processor configurations

Model number	Clock	L2 cache	HT	Voltage	TDP (W)	Socket	Release date	Memory support	Part number	Stepping	Release price
B3 & C0 & CG, Single core
240	1.4 GHz	1 MiB	800 MHz	1.55	84.7	940	April 22, 2003	DDR-333	OSA240CCO5AH	B3	$283
240	1.4 GHz	1 MiB	800 MHz	1.50	82.1	940	August 5, 2003	DDR-400	OSA240CEP5AL	C0	$256
240	1.4 GHz	1 MiB	800 MHz	1.50	82.1	940	May 18, 2004	DDR-400	OSA240CEP5AU	CG	$198
242	1.6 GHz	1 MiB	800 MHz	1.55	84.7	940	April 22, 2003	DDR-333	OSA242CCO5AH	B3	$690
242	1.6 GHz	1 MiB	800 MHz	1.50	82.1	940	August 5, 2003	DDR-400	OSA242CEP5AL	C0	$455
242	1.6 GHz	1 MiB	800 MHz	1.50	82.1	940	May 18, 2004	DDR-400	OSA242CEP5AU	CG	$209
244	1.8 GHz	1 MiB	800 MHz	1.55	84.7	940	April 22, 2003 (Note: Mass-market availability in June 2003.)	DDR-333	OSA244CCO5AH	B3	$794
244	1.8 GHz	1 MiB	800 MHz	1.50	82.1	940	August 5, 2003	DDR-400	OSA244CEP5AL	C0	$690
244	1.8 GHz	1 MiB	800 MHz	1.50	82.1	940	May 18, 2004	DDR-400	OSA244CEP5AU	CG	$316
246	2.0 GHz	1 MiB	800 MHz	1.50	89	940	August 5, 2003	DDR-400	OSA246CEP5AL	C0	$794
246	2.0 GHz	1 MiB	800 MHz	1.50	89	940	May 18, 2004	DDR-400	OSA246CEP5AU	CG	$455
248	2.2 GHz	1 MiB	800 MHz	1.50	89	940	November 17, 2003	DDR-400	OSA248CEP5AL	C0	$913
248	2.2 GHz	1 MiB	800 MHz	1.50	89	940	May 18, 2004	DDR-400	OSA248CEP5AU	CG	$690
250	2.4 GHz	1 MiB	800 MHz	1.50	89	940	May 18, 2004	DDR-400	OSA250CEP5AU	CG	$851
CG, Single core, high-efficiency
246 HE	2.0 GHz	1 MiB	800 MHz	1.30	55	940	February 14, 2004	DDR-400	OSK246CMP5AU	CG	$851
CG, Single core, energy-efficient
240 EE	1.4 GHz	1 MiB	800 MHz	1.15	30	940	February 14, 2004	DDR-400	OSB240CSP5AU	CG	$851

==== 800 series "SledgeHammer" ====
- All models support: MMX, SSE, SSE2, Enhanced 3DNow!, NX bit, AMD64
- All models with OPN ending in AI support up to Registered PC2700 DDR SDRAM
- All other models support up to Registered PC3200 DDR SDRAM
- All models support up to eight-processor configurations

Model number	Clock	L2 cache	HT	Voltage	TDP (W)	Socket	Release date	Memory support	Part number	Stepping	Release price
B3 & C0 & CG, Single core
840	1.4 GHz	1 MiB	800 MHz	1.55	84.7	940	June 30, 2003	DDR-333	OSA840CCO5AI	B3	$749
840	1.4 GHz	1 MiB	800 MHz	1.50	82.1	940	September 9, 2003	DDR-400	OSA840CEP5AM	C0	
840	1.4 GHz	1 MiB	800 MHz	1.50	82.1	940	May 18, 2004	DDR-400	OSA840CEP5AV	CG	$698
842	1.6 GHz	1 MiB	800 MHz	1.55	84.7	940	June 30, 2003	DDR-333	OSA842CCO5AI	B3	$1,299
842	1.6 GHz	1 MiB	800 MHz	1.50	82.1	940	September 9, 2003	DDR-400	OSA842CEP5AM	C0	
842	1.6 GHz	1 MiB	800 MHz	1.50	82.1	940	May 18, 2004	DDR-400	OSA842CEP5AV	CG	$698
844	1.8 GHz	1 MiB	800 MHz	1.55	84.7	940	June 30, 2003	DDR-333	OSB844CCO5AI	B3	$2,149
844	1.8 GHz	1 MiB	800 MHz	1.50	82.1	940	September 9, 2003	DDR-400	OSA844CEP5AM	C0	
844	1.8 GHz	1 MiB	800 MHz	1.50	82.1	940	May 18, 2004	DDR-400	OSA844CEP5AV	CG	$698
846	2.0 GHz	1 MiB	800 MHz	1.50	89	940	September 9, 2003	DDR-400	OSA846CEP5AM	C0	$3,199
846	2.0 GHz	1 MiB	800 MHz	1.50	89	940	May 18, 2004	DDR-400	OSA846CEP5AV	CG	$873
848	2.2 GHz	1 MiB	800 MHz	1.50	89	940	November 17, 2003	DDR-400	OSA848CEP5AM	C0	$3,199
848	2.2 GHz	1 MiB	800 MHz	1.50	89	940	May 18, 2004	DDR-400	OSA848CEP5AV	CG	$1,165
850	2.4 GHz	1 MiB	800 MHz	1.50	89	940	May 18, 2004	DDR-400	OSA850CEP5AV	CG	$1,514
CG, Single core, high-efficiency
846 HE	2.0 GHz	1 MiB	800 MHz	1.30	55	940	May 18, 2004	DDR-400	OSK846CMP5AV	CG	$1,514
CG, Single core, energy-efficient
840 EE	1.4 GHz	1 MiB	800 MHz	1.15	30	940	May 18, 2004	DDR-400	OSB840CSP5AV	CG	$1,514

=== First Gen. Opterons (90 nm) ===
==== 100 series "Venus" (s939) ====
- All models support: MMX, SSE, SSE2, SSE3, Enhanced 3DNow!, NX bit, AMD64
- All models support up to Unbuffered PC3200 DDR SDRAM
- All models only support single-processor configurations

Model number	Clock	L2 cache	HT	Voltage	TDP (W)	Socket	Release Date	Part number
E4 & E6, Single core
144	1.8 GHz	1 MiB	1 GHz	1.35/1.4	85.3	939	2 August 2005	OSA144DAA5BN(E4)
144	1.8 GHz	1 MiB	1 GHz	1.35/1.4	67	939	2 August 2005	OSA144DAA5CF(E6)
146	2.0 GHz	1 MiB	1 GHz	1.35/1.4	67	939	2 August 2005	OSA146DAA5BN(E4)
146	2.0 GHz	1 MiB	1 GHz	1.35/1.4	67	939	2 August 2005	OSA146DAA5CF(E6)
148	2.2 GHz	1 MiB	1 GHz	1.35/1.4	85.3	939	2 August 2005	OSA148DAA5BN(E4)
148	2.2 GHz	1 MiB	1 GHz	1.35/1.4	85.3	939	2 August 2005	OSA148DAA5CF(E6)
150	2.4 GHz	1 MiB	1 GHz	1.35/1.4	85.3	939	2 August 2005	OSA150DAA5BN(E4)
150	2.4 GHz	1 MiB	1 GHz	1.35/1.4	85.3	939	2 August 2005	OSA150DAA5CF(E6)
152	2.6 GHz	1 MiB	1 GHz	1.35/1.4	104	939	2 August 2005	OSA152DAA5BN(E4)
152	2.6 GHz	1 MiB	1 GHz	1.35/1.4	104	939	2 August 2005	OSA152DAA5CF(E6)
154	2.8 GHz	1 MiB	1 GHz	1.35/1.4	104	939	2 August 2005	OSA154DAA5BN(E4)
156	3.0 GHz	1 MiB	1 GHz	1.35/1.4	104	939	May 2006	OSA156DAA5BN(E4)

==== 100 series "Venus" ====
- All models support: MMX, SSE, SSE2, SSE3, Enhanced 3DNow!, NX bit, AMD64
- All models support up to Registered PC3200 DDR SDRAM
- All models only support single-processor configurations

Model number	Clock	L2 cache	HT	Voltage	TDP (W)	Socket	Release date	Part number	Release price (USD)
E4 & D4, Single core
142	1.6 GHz	1 MiB	1 GHz	1.35/1.4	67	940	December 2004	OSA142FAA5BK(E4)	$163
144	1.8 GHz	1 MiB	1 GHz	1.35/1.4	67	940	December 2004	OSA144FAA5BK(E4)	$178
146	2.0 GHz	1 MiB	1 GHz	1.35/1.4	67	940	December 2004	OSA146FAA5BK(E4); OSA146FIK5BB(D4)	$218
148	2.2 GHz	1 MiB	1 GHz	1.35/1.4	85.3	940	December 2004	OSA148FAA5BK(E4)	$278
150	2.4 GHz	1 MiB	1 GHz	1.35/1.4	85.3	940	December 2004	OSA150FAA5BK(E4)	$417
152	2.6 GHz	1 MiB	1 GHz	1.35/1.4	104	940	December 2004	OSA152FAA5BK(E4)	$637
154	2.8 GHz	1 MiB	1 GHz	1.35/1.4	104	940	2006	OSA154FAA5BK(E4)	$301
E4, Single core, high-efficiency
148 HE	2.2 GHz	1 MiB	1 GHz	1.35/1.4	55	940	December 2004	OSK148FAA5BK	$417

==== 200 series "Troy" ====
- All models support: MMX, SSE, SSE2, SSE3, Enhanced 3DNow!, NX bit, AMD64
- All models support up to Registered PC3200 DDR SDRAM
- All models support up to two-processor configurations

Model number	Clock	L2 cache	HT	Voltage	TDP (W)	Socket	Release date	Part number	Release price (USD)
E4 & D4, Single core
242	1.6 GHz	1 MiB	1 GHz	1.35/1.4	85.3	940	Dec 2004	OSA242FAA5BL(E4)	$163
244	1.8 GHz	1 MiB	1 GHz	1.35/1.4	85.3	940	Dec 2004	OSA244FAA5BL(E4)	$209
246	2.0 GHz	1 MiB	1 GHz	1.35/1.4	85.3; 67	940	Dec 2004	OSA246FAA5BL(E4); OSA246FIK5BC(D4)	$316
248	2.2 GHz	1 MiB	1 GHz	1.35/1.4	85.3; 67	940	Dec 2004	OSA248FAA5BL(E4); OSA248FIK5BC(D4)	$455
250	2.4 GHz	1 MiB	1 GHz	1.35/1.4	85.3; 68	940	Dec 2004	OSA250FAA5BL(E4); OSP250FAA5BL(E4)	$690
252	2.6 GHz	1 MiB	1 GHz	1.35/1.4	92.6; 68	940	Feb 14, 2005	OSA252FAA5BL(E4); OSP252FAA5BL(E4)	$851
254	2.8 GHz	1 MiB	1 GHz	1.35/1.4	92.6; 68	940	Aug 2005	OSA254FAA5BL(E4); OSP254FAA5BL(E4)	$851
256	3.0 GHz	1 MiB	1 GHz	1.35/1.4	92.6	940	April 2006	OSA256FAA5BL(E4)	$851
E4, Single core, high-efficiency
246 HE	2.0 GHz	1 MiB	1 GHz	1.35/1.4	55	940	Mar 2005	OSK246FAA5BL(E4)	$455
248 HE	2.2 GHz	1 MiB	1 GHz	1.35/1.4	55	940	Mar 2005	OSK248FAA5BL(E4)	$690
250 HE	2.4 GHz	1 MiB	1 GHz	1.35/1.4	55	940	Mar 2005	OSK250FAA5BL(E4)	$851

==== 800 series "Athens" ====
- All models support: MMX, SSE, SSE2, SSE3, Enhanced 3DNow!, NX bit, AMD64
- All models support up to Registered PC3200 DDR SDRAM
- All models support up to eight-processor configurations

Model number	Clock	L2 cache	HT	Voltage	TDP (W)	Socket	Release date	Part number	Release price (USD)
E4 & D4, Single core
842	1.6 GHz	1 MiB	1 GHz	1.35/1.4	85.3	940	Dec 2004	OSA842FAA5BM(E4)	$698
844	1.8 GHz	1 MiB	1 GHz	1.35/1.4	85.3	940	Dec 2004	OSA844FAA5BM(E4)	$698
846	2.0 GHz	1 MiB	1 GHz	1.35/1.4	85.3; 67	940	Dec 2004	OSA846FAA5BM(E4); OSA846FIK5BD (D4)	$698
848	2.2 GHz	1 MiB	1 GHz	1.35/1.4	85.3	940	Dec 2004	OSA848FAA5BM(E4)	$873
850	2.4 GHz	1 MiB	1 GHz	1.35/1.4	85.3	940	Dec 2004	OSA850FAA5BM(E4)	$1,165
852	2.6 GHz	1 MiB	1 GHz	1.35/1.4	92.6; 68	940	Feb 14, 2005	OSA852FAA5BM(E4); OSP852FAA5BM(E4)	$1,514
854	2.8 GHz	1 MiB	1 GHz	1.35/1.4	92.6; 68	940	Aug 2005	OSA854FAA5BM(E4); OSP854FAA5BM(E4)	$1,514
856	3.0 GHz	1 MiB	1 GHz	1.35/1.4	92.6	940	April 2006	OSA856FAA5BM(E4)	$1,514
E4, Single core, high-efficiency
846 HE	2.0 GHz	1 MiB	1 GHz	1.35/1.4	55	940	Mar 2005	OSK846FAA5BM(E4)	$873
848 HE	2.2 GHz	1 MiB	1 GHz	1.35/1.4	55	940	Mar 2005	OSK848FAA5BM(E4)	$1,165
850 HE	2.4 GHz	1 MiB	1 GHz	1.35/1.4	55	940	Mar 2005	OSK850FAA5BM(E4)	$1,514

=== Dual-core Opteron (90 nm) ===
==== 100 series "Denmark" (s939) ====
- All models support: MMX, SSE, SSE2, SSE3, Enhanced 3DNow!, NX bit, AMD64
- All models support up to Unbuffered PC3200 DDR SDRAM
- All models only support single-processor configurations

Model number	Clock	L2 cache	HT	Voltage	TDP (W)	Socket	Release date	Part number	Release price (USD)
E6, Dual core
165	1.8 GHz	1 MiB (per core)	1 GHz	1.35/1.3	110	939	2 Aug 2005	OSA165DAA6CD	$417
170	2.0 GHz	1 MiB (per core)	1 GHz	1.35/1.3	110	939	2 Aug 2005	OSA170DAA6CD	$475
175	2.2 GHz	1 MiB (per core)	1 GHz	1.35/1.3	110	939	2 Aug 2005	OSA175DAA6CD	$530
180	2.4 GHz	1 MiB (per core)	1 GHz	1.35/1.3	110	939	26 Sep 2005	OSA180DAA6CD	$799
185	2.6 GHz	1 MiB (per core)	1 GHz	1.35/1.3	110	939	6 Mar 2006	OSA185DAA6CD	$435
190	2.8 GHz	1 MiB (per core)	1 GHz	1.35/1.3	110	939	?	OSA190DAA6CD	

==== 200 series "Italy" ====
- All models support: MMX, SSE, SSE2, SSE3, Enhanced 3DNow!, NX bit, AMD64
- All models support up to Registered PC3200 DDR SDRAM
- All models support up to two-processor configurations

Model number	Clock	L2 cache	HT	Voltage	TDP (W)	Socket	Release date	Part number	Release price (USD)
E6, Dual core
265	1.8 GHz	1 MiB (per core)	1 GHz	1.3/1.35	95	940	May 31, 2005	OSA265FAA6CB	$851
265	1.8 GHz	1 MiB (per core)	1 GHz	1.25	68	940	2005	OSP265FAA6CB	
270	2.0 GHz	1 MiB (per core)	1 GHz	1.3/1.35	95	940	May 31, 2005	OSA270FAA6CB	$1,051
270	2.0 GHz	1 MiB (per core)	1 GHz	1.3/1.35	85	940	2005	OST270FAA6CB	
270	2.0 GHz	1 MiB (per core)	1 GHz	1.25	68	940	2005	OSP270FAA6CB	
275	2.2 GHz	1 MiB (per core)	1 GHz	1.3/1.35	95	940	May 31, 2005	OSA275FAA6CB	$1,299
275	2.2 GHz	1 MiB (per core)	1 GHz	1.3/1.35	85	940	2005	OST275FAA6CB	
275	2.2 GHz	1 MiB (per core)	1 GHz	1.25	68	940	2005	OSP275FAA6CB	
280	2.4 GHz	1 MiB (per core)	1 GHz	1.3/1.35	95	940	September 26, 2005	OSA280FAA6CB	$1,299
280	2.4 GHz	1 MiB (per core)	1 GHz	1.3/1.35	85	940	2005	OST280FAA6CB	
280	2.4 GHz	1 MiB (per core)	1 GHz	1.25	68	940	2005	OSP280FAA6CB	
285	2.6 GHz	1 MiB (per core)	1 GHz	1.3/1.35	95	940	March 6, 2006	OSA285FAA6CB	$1,051
285	2.6 GHz	1 MiB (per core)	1 GHz	1.3/1.35	85	940	2006	OST285FAA6CB	
290	2.8 GHz	1 MiB (per core)	1 GHz	1.3/1.35	95	940	2007	OSA290FAA6CB	$698
E6, Dual core, high-efficiency
260 HE	1.6 GHz	1 MiB (per core)	1 GHz	1.15/1.20	55	940	Aug 1, 2005	OSK260FAA6CB	$1,051
265 HE	1.8 GHz	1 MiB (per core)	1 GHz	1.15/1.20	55	940	Aug 1, 2005	OSK265FAA6CB	$1,299
270 HE	2.0 GHz	1 MiB (per core)	1 GHz	1.15/1.20	55	940	Dec 2005	OSK270FAA6CB	$1,299
275 HE	2.2 GHz	1 MiB (per core)	1 GHz	1.15/1.20	55	940	Feb 2006	OSK275FAA6CB	$1,051

==== 800 series "Egypt" ====
- All models support: MMX, SSE, SSE2, SSE3, Enhanced 3DNow!, NX bit, AMD64
- All models support up to Registered PC3200 DDR SDRAM
- All models support up to eight-processor configurations

Model number	Clock	L2 cache	HT	Voltage	TDP (W)	Socket	Release date	Part number	Release price (USD)
E1 & E6, Dual core
865	1.8 GHz	1 MiB (per core)	1 GHz	1.3/1.35	95	940	April 2005	OSA865FKM6BS(E1)	$1,514
865	1.8 GHz	1 MiB (per core)	1 GHz	1.3/1.35	85	940	2005	OST865FKQ6BS(E1)	
865	1.8 GHz	1 MiB (per core)	1 GHz	1.3/1.35	95	940	September 26, 2005	OSA865FAA6CC(E6)	$1,165
865	1.8 GHz	1 MiB (per core)	1 GHz	1.3/1.35	85	940	2005	OST865FAA6CC (E6)	
870	2.0 GHz	1 MiB (per core)	1 GHz	1.3/1.35	95	940	April 2005	OSA870FKM6BS(E1)	$2,149
870	2.0 GHz	1 MiB (per core)	1 GHz	1.3/1.35	85	940	2005	OST870FKQ6BSS(E1)	
870	2.0 GHz	1 MiB (per core)	1 GHz	1.3/1.35	95	940	September 26, 2005	OSA870FAA6CC (E6)	$1,514
870	2.0 GHz	1 MiB (per core)	1 GHz	1.3/1.35	85	940	2005	OST870FAA6CC (E6)	
875	2.2 GHz	1 MiB (per core)	1 GHz	1.3/1.35	95	940	April 2005	OSA875FKM6BS (E1)	$2,649
875	2.2 GHz	1 MiB (per core)	1 GHz	1.3/1.35	85	940	2005	OST875FKQ6BS (E1)	
875	2.2 GHz	1 MiB (per core)	1 GHz	1.3/1.35	95	940	September 26, 2005	OSA875FAA6CC (E6)	$2,149
875	2.2 GHz	1 MiB (per core)	1 GHz	1.3/1.35	85	940	2005	OST875FAA6CC (E6)	
880	2.4 GHz	1 MiB (per core)	1 GHz	1.3/1.35	95	940	September 26, 2005	OSA880FAA6CC (E6)	$2,649
880	2.4 GHz	1 MiB (per core)	1 GHz	1.3/1.35	85	940	2005	OST880FAA6CC (E6)	
885	2.6 GHz	1 MiB (per core)	1 GHz	1.3/1.35	95	940	March 6, 2006	OSA885FAA6CC (E6)	$2,149
885	2.6 GHz	1 MiB (per core)	1 GHz	1.3/1.35	85	940	2006	OST885FAA6CC (E6)	
890	2.8 GHz	1 MiB (per core)	1 GHz	1.3/1.35	95	940	2007	OSA890FAA6CC (E6)	$1,514
E6, Dual core, high-efficiency
860 HE	1.6 GHz	1 MiB (per core)	1 GHz	1.15/1.20	55	940	August 1, 2005	OSK860FAA6CC	$2,149
865 HE	1.8 GHz	1 MiB (per core)	1 GHz	1.15/1.20	55	940	August 1, 2005	OSK865FAA6CC	$2,649
870 HE	2.0 GHz	1 MiB (per core)	1 GHz	1.15/1.20	55	940	December 2005	OSK870FAA6CC	$2,649
875 HE	2.2 GHz	1 MiB (per core)	1 GHz	1.15/1.20	55	940	February 2006	OSK875FAA6CC	$2,149

=== Second Gen. Opterons (90nm) ===
==== 1200 series "Santa Ana" ====
- All models support: MMX, SSE, SSE2, SSE3, Enhanced 3DNow!, NX bit, AMD64, AMD-V
- All models support up to Unbuffered PC2-6400 DDR2 SDRAM, the socket F 1210 EE model supports Registered DDR2 memory
- All models only support single-processor configurations

Model number	Step.	Clock	L2 cache	HT	Voltage	TDP (W)	Socket	Release date	Part number	Release price (USD)
F2 & F3, Dual core
1210	F2, F3	1.8 GHz	1 MiB (per core)	1 GHz	1.3/1.35	103	AM2	August 15, 2006	OSA1210IAA6CS(F2); OSA1210IAA6CZ(F3)	$164
1212	F2, F3	2.0 GHz	1 MiB (per core)	1 GHz	1.3/1.35	103	AM2	August 15, 2006	OSA1212IAA6CS(F2); OSA1212IAA6CZ(F3)	$201
1214	F2, F3	2.2 GHz	1 MiB (per core)	1 GHz	1.3/1.35	103	AM2	August 15, 2006	OSA1214IAA6CS(F2); OSA1214IAA6CZ(F3)	$259
1216	F2, F3	2.4 GHz	1 MiB (per core)	1 GHz	1.3/1.35	103	AM2	August 15, 2006	OSA1216IAA6CS(F2); OSA1216IAA6CZ(F3)	$325
1218	F2, F3	2.6 GHz	1 MiB (per core)	1 GHz	1.3/1.35	103	AM2	August 15, 2006	OSA1218IAA6CS(F2); OSA1218IAA6CZ(F3)	$435
1220	F3	2.8 GHz	1 MiB (per core)	1 GHz	1.3/1.35	103	AM2	February; 2007	OSA1220IAA6CZ(F3)	$545
1222	F3	3.0 GHz	1 MiB (per core)	1 GHz	1.3/1.35	103	AM2	February; 2007	OSA1222IAA6CZ(F3)	$360
1220 SE	F3	2.8 GHz	1 MiB (per core)	1 GHz	1.35/1.40	125	AM2	August 15, 2006	OSX1220IAA6CS(F2); OSX1220IAA6CZ(F3)	$611
1222 SE	F3	3.0 GHz	1 MiB (per core)	1 GHz	1.35/1.40	125	AM2	April 23, 2007	OSX1222IAA6CZ(F3)	$655
1224 SE	F3	3.2 GHz	1 MiB (per core)	1 GHz	1.35/1.40	125	AM2	August 5, 2007	OSX1224IAA6CZ(F3)	$360
F3, Dual core, high-efficiency
1210 HE	F3	1.8 GHz	1 MiB (per core)	1 GHz	1.2/1.25	65	AM2	February 2007	OSO1210IAA6CZ(F3)	$168
1212 HE	F3	2.0 GHz	1 MiB (per core)	1 GHz	1.2/1.25	65	AM2	February 2007	OSO1212IAA6CZ(F3)	$209
1214 HE	F3	2.2 GHz	1 MiB (per core)	1 GHz	1.2/1.25	65	AM2	February 2007	OSO1214IAA6CZ(F3)	$247
1216 HE	F3	2.4 GHz	1 MiB (per core)	1 GHz	1.2/1.25	65	AM2	February 2007	OSO1216IAA6CZ(F3)	$291
1218 HE	F3	2.6 GHz	1 MiB (per core)	1 GHz	1.2/1.25	65	AM2	February 2007	OSO1218IAA6CZ(F3)	$432
F3, Dual core, energy-efficient
1210 EE	F3	1.8 GHz	1 MiB (per core)	1 GHz	1.2	45	F	August 15, 2006	OSH1210GAS6DGE(F3)	

==== 2200 series "Santa Rosa" ====
- All models support: MMX, SSE, SSE2, SSE3, Enhanced 3DNow!, NX bit, AMD64, AMD-V
- All models support up to Registered PC2-5300 DDR2 SDRAM
- All models support up to two-processor configurations

Model number	Step.	Clock	L2 cache	HT	Voltage	TDP (W)	Socket	Release date	Part number	Release price (USD)
F2 & F3, Dual core
2210	F2, F3	1.8 GHz	1 MiB (per core)	1 GHz	1.30/1.35	95	F	August 15, 2006	OSA2210GAA6CQ(F2); OSA2210GAA6CX(F3)	$255
2212	F2, F3	2.0 GHz	1 MiB (per core)	1 GHz	1.30/1.35	95	F	August 15, 2006	OSA2212GAA6CQ(F2); OSA2212GAA6CX(F3)	$377
2214	F2, F3	2.2 GHz	1 MiB (per core)	1 GHz	1.30/1.35	95	F	August 15, 2006	OSA2214GAA6CQ(F2); OSA2214GAA6CX(F3)	$523
2216	F2, F3	2.4 GHz	1 MiB (per core)	1 GHz	1.30/1.35	95	F	August 15, 2006	OSA2216GAA6CQ(F2); OSA2216GAA6CX(F3)	$698
2218	F2, F3	2.6 GHz	1 MiB (per core)	1 GHz	1.30/1.35	95	F	August 15, 2006	OSA2218GAA6CQ(F2); OSA2218GAA6CX(F3)	$873
2220	F3	2.8 GHz	1 MiB (per core)	1 GHz	1.30/1.35	95	F	February 2007	OSA2220GAA6CX(F3)	$698
2222	F3	3.0 GHz	1 MiB (per core)	1 GHz	1.30/1.35	95	F	August 5, 2007	OSA2222GAA6CX(F3)	
2220 SE	F2, F3	2.8 GHz	1 MiB (per core)	1 GHz	1.325/1.375	119	F	August 15, 2006	OSY2220GAA6CQ(F2); OSY2220GAA6CX(F3)	$1,165
2222 SE	F3	3.0 GHz	1 MiB (per core)	1 GHz	1.325/1.375	119	F	April 23, 2007	OSY2222GAA6CX(F3)	$873
2224 SE	F3	3.2 GHz	1 MiB (per core)	1 GHz	1.325/1.375	119	F	August 5, 2007	OSY2224GAA6CX(F3)	
F2 & F3, Dual core, high-efficiency
2208 HE	F3	1.8 GHz	512 kiB (per core)	1 GHz	1.2/1.25	68	F	August 15, 2006	OSP2208GAA5CXE(F3)	
2210 HE	F2, F3	1.8 GHz	1 MiB (per core)	1 GHz	1.20/1.25	68	F	August 15, 2006	OSP2210GAA6CQ (F2); OSP2210GAA6CX (F3)	$316
2212 HE	F2, F3	2.0 GHz	1 MiB (per core)	1 GHz	1.20/1.25	68	F	August 15, 2006	OSP2212GAA6CQ (F2); OSP2212GAA6CX (F3)	$450
2214 HE	F2, F3	2.2 GHz	1 MiB (per core)	1 GHz	1.20/1.25	68	F	August 15, 2006	OSP2214GAA6CQ (F2); OSP2214GAA6CX (F3)	$611
2216 HE	F2, F3	2.4 GHz	1 MiB (per core)	1 GHz	1.20/1.25	68	F	August 15, 2006	OSP2216GAA6CQ (F2); OSP2216GAA6CX (F3)	$786
2218 HE	F3	2.6 GHz	1 MiB (per core)	1 GHz	1.20/1.25	68	F	February 2007	OSP2218GAA6CX (F3)	$611
F3, Dual core, energy-efficient
2210 EE	F3	1.8 GHz	1 MiB (per core)	1 GHz	1.2	45	F	August 15, 2006	OSH2210GAS6CXE(F3)	

==== 8200 series "Santa Rosa" ====
- All models support: MMX, SSE, SSE2, SSE3, Enhanced 3DNow!, NX bit, AMD64, AMD-V
- All models support up to Registered PC2-5300 DDR2 SDRAM
- All models support up to eight-processor configurations

Model number	Step.	Clock	L2 cache	HT	Voltage	TDP (W)	Socket	Release date	Part number	Release price (USD)
F2 & F3, Dual core
8212	F2, F3	2.0 GHz	1 MiB (per core)	1 GHz	1.30/1.35	95	F	August 15, 2006	OSA8212GAA6CR(F2); OSA8212GAA6CY(F3)	$873
8214	F2, F3	2.2 GHz	1 MiB (per core)	1 GHz	1.30/1.35	95	F	August 15, 2006	OSA8214GAA6CR(F2); OSA8214GAA6CY(F3)	$1,165
8216	F2, F3	2.4 GHz	1 MiB (per core)	1 GHz	1.30/1.35	95	F	August 15, 2006	OSA8216GAA6CR(F2); OSA8216GAA6CY(F3)	$1,514
8218	F2, F3	2.6 GHz	1 MiB (per core)	1 GHz	1.30/1.35	95	F	August 15, 2006	OSA8218GAA6CR(F2); OSA8218GAA6CY(F3)	$2,149
8220	F3	2.8	1 MiB (per core)	1 GHz	1.30/1.35	95	F	February 2007	OSA8220GAA6CY(F3)	$1,514
8222	F3	3.0 GHz	1 MiB (per core)	1 GHz	1.30/1.35	95	F	August 5, 2007	OSA8222GAA6CY(F3)	
8220 SE	F2, F3	2.8 GHz	1 MiB (per core)	1 GHz	1.325/1.375	120	F	August 15, 2006	OSY8220GAA6CR(F2); OSY8220GAA6CY(F3)	$2,649
8222 SE	F3	3.0 GHz	1 MiB (per core)	1 GHz	1.325/1.375	120	F	April 23, 2007	OSY8222GAA6CY(F3)	$2,149
8224 SE	F3	3.2 GHz	1 MiB (per core)	1 GHz	1.325/1.375	120	F	August 5, 2007	OSY8224GAA6CY(F3)	$2,149
F2 & F3, Dual core, high-efficiency
8212 HE	F2, F3	2.0 GHz	1 MiB (per core)	1 GHz	1.20/1.25	68	F	August 15, 2006	OSP8212GAA6CR(F2); OSP8212GAA6CY(F3)	$1,019
8214 HE	F2, F3	2.2 GHz	1 MiB (per core)	1 GHz	1.20/1.25	68	F	August 15, 2006	OSP8214GAA6CR(F2); OSP8214GAA6CY(F3)	$1,340
8216 HE	F2, F3	2.4 GHz	1 MiB (per core)	1 GHz	1.20/1.25	68	F	August 15, 2006	OSP8216GAA6CR(F2); OSP8216GAA6CY(F3)	$1,832
8218 HE	F3	2.6 GHz	1 MiB (per core)	1 GHz	1.20/1.25	68	F	February 2007	OSP8218GAA6CY(F3)	$1,340
F3, Dual core, energy-efficient
8210 EE	F3	1.8 GHz	1 MiB (per core)	1 GHz	1.2	45	F	August 15, 2006	OSH8210GAS6CYE(F3)	

== K10 Opterons (Family 10h) ==
=== Quad-core Opteron (65nm) ===
- All models support the x86-64 "baseline" profile
- All models support additionally: Enhanced 3DNow!, SSE3, SSE4a, ABM, NX bit, AMD-V with nested paging

==== 1300 series "Budapest" ====
- Socket AM2+ platform, single-processor only
- All models support up to dual-channel Unbuffered PC2-6400 DDR2 SDRAM
- B1, B2, and BA steppings have a hardware TLB bug, affecting performance under certain conditions, see AMD errata #298

Model number	Step.	Cores	Clock	L2 cache	L3 cache	HT (GHz)	TDP	Socket	Release date	Part number	Release price (USD)
Quad-core
1352	B2	4	2.1 GHz	512 KiB (per core)	2 MiB	1.8	95 W	AM2+	3 June 2008	OS1352WBJ4BGD	
1352	B3	4	2.1 GHz	512 KiB (per core)	2 MiB	2.0	95 W	AM2+	3 June 2008	OS1352WBJ4BGH	$209
1354	B3	4	2.2 GHz	512 KiB (per core)	2 MiB	2.0	95 W	AM2+	3 June 2008	OS1354WBJ4BGH	$255
1356	B3	4	2.3 GHz	512 KiB (per core)	2 MiB	2.0	95 W	AM2+	3 June 2008	OS1356WBJ4BGH	$377

==== 2300 series "Barcelona" ====
- Socket F platform
- All models support up to two-processor configurations
- All models support up to dual-channel Registered PC2-5300 DDR2 SDRAM
- B1, B2, and BA steppings have a hardware TLB bug, affecting performance under certain conditions, see AMD errata #298

Model number	Step.	Cores	Clock	L2 cache	L3 cache	HT (GHz)	TDP	Socket	Release date	Part number	Release price (USD)
Quad Core
2347	B1	4	1.9 GHz	512 KiB (per core)	2 MiB	1.0	95 W	F (1207)	September 10, 2007	OS2347WAL4BGC	$316
2347	B2	4	1.9 GHz	512 KiB (per core)	2 MiB	1.0	95 W	F (1207)	September 10, 2007	OS2347WAL4BGD	$316
2347	BA	4	1.9 GHz	512 KiB (per core)	2 MiB	1.0	95 W	F (1207)	September 10, 2007	OS2347WAL4BGE	$316
2347	B3	4	1.9 GHz	512 KiB (per core)	2 MiB	1.0	95 W	F (1207)	April 9, 2008	OS2347WAL4BGH	$316
2350	B1	4	2.0 GHz	512 KiB (per core)	2 MiB	1.0	95 W	F (1207)	September 10, 2007	OS2350WAL4BGC	$389
2350	B2	4	2.0 GHz	512 KiB (per core)	2 MiB	1.0	95 W	F (1207)	September 10, 2007	OS2350WAL4BGD	$389
2350	BA	4	2.0 GHz	512 KiB (per core)	2 MiB	1.0	95 W	F (1207)	September 10, 2007	OS2350WAL4BGE	$389
2350	B3	4	2.0 GHz	512 KiB (per core)	2 MiB	1.0	95 W	F (1207)	April 9, 2008	OS2350WAL4BGH	$389
2352	B2	4	2.1 GHz	512 KiB (per core)	2 MiB	1.0	95 W	F (1207)	April 9, 2008	OS2352WAL4BGD	$316
2352	B3	4	2.1 GHz	512 KiB (per core)	2 MiB	1.0	95 W	F (1207)	April 9, 2008	OS2352WAL4BGH	$316
2354	B2	4	2.2 GHz	512 KiB (per core)	2 MiB	1.0	95 W	F (1207)	April 9, 2008	OS2354WAL4BGD	$455
2354	B3	4	2.2 GHz	512 KiB (per core)	2 MiB	1.0	95 W	F (1207)	April 9, 2008	OS2354WAL4BGH	$455
2356	B2	4	2.3 GHz	512 KiB (per core)	2 MiB	1.0	95 W	F (1207)	April 9, 2008	OS2356WAL4BGD	$690
2356	B3	4	2.3 GHz	512 KiB (per core)	2 MiB	1.0	95 W	F (1207)	April 9, 2008	OS2356WAL4BGH	$690
2358 SE	B2	4	2.4 GHz	512 KiB (per core)	2 MiB	1.0	119 W	F (1207)	June 9, 2008	OS2358YAL4BGD	$873
2358 SE	B3	4	2.4 GHz	512 KiB (per core)	2 MiB	1.0	119 W	F (1207)	June 9, 2008	OS2358YAL4BGH	$873
2360 SE	B2	4	2.5 GHz	512 KiB (per core)	2 MiB	1.0	119 W	F (1207)	June 9, 2008	OS2360YAL4BGD	$1,165
2360 SE	B3	4	2.5 GHz	512 KiB (per core)	2 MiB	1.0	119 W	F (1207)	June 9, 2008	OS2360YAL4BGH	$1,165
2344 HE	B1	4	1.7 GHz	512 KiB (per core)	2 MiB	1.0	68 W	F (1207)	September 10, 2007	OS2344PAL4BGC	$209
2344 HE	BA	4	1.7 GHz	512 KiB (per core)	2 MiB	1.0	68 W	F (1207)	September 10, 2007	OS2344PAL4BGE	$209
2344 HE	B3	4	1.7 GHz	512 KiB (per core)	2 MiB	1.0	68 W	F (1207)	April 9, 2008	OS2344PAL4BGH	$209
2346 HE	B1	4	1.8 GHz	512 KiB (per core)	2 MiB	1.0	68 W	F (1207)	September 10, 2007	OS2346PAL4BGC	$255
2346 HE	BA	4	1.8 GHz	512 KiB (per core)	2 MiB	1.0	68 W	F (1207)	September 10, 2007	OS2346PAL4BGE	$255
2346 HE	B3	4	1.8 GHz	512 KiB (per core)	2 MiB	1.0	68 W	F (1207)	April 9, 2008	OS2346PAL4BGH	$255
2347 HE	BA	4	1.9 GHz	512 KiB (per core)	2 MiB	1.0	68 W	F (1207)	September 10, 2007	OS2347PAL4BGE	$377
2347 HE	B3	4	1.9 GHz	512 KiB (per core)	2 MiB	1.0	68 W	F (1207)	April 9, 2008	OS2347PAL4BGH	$377
2350 HE	B3	4	2.0 GHz	512 KiB (per core)	2 MiB	1.0	79 W	F (1207)	October, 2008	OS2350PAL4BGH	$316

==== 8300 series "Barcelona" ====
- Socket F platform
- All models support up to eight-processor configurations
- All models support up to dual-channel Registered PC2-5300 DDR2 SDRAM
- B1, B2, and BA steppings have a hardware TLB bug, affecting performance under certain conditions, see AMD errata #298

Model number	Step.	Cores	Clock	L2 cache	L3 cache	HT (GHz)	TDP	Socket	Release date	Part number	Release price (USD)
Quad Core
8347	B1	4	1.9 GHz	512 KiB (per core)	2 MiB	1.0	95 W	F (1207)	September 10, 2007	OS8347WAL4BGC	$786
8347	BA	4	1.9 GHz	512 KiB (per core)	2 MiB	1.0	95 W	F (1207)	September 10, 2007	OS8347WAL4BGE	$786
8350	B1	4	2.0 GHz	512 KiB (per core)	2 MiB	1.0	95 W	F (1207)	September 10, 2007	OS8350WAL4BGC	$1,019
8350	B2	4	2.0 GHz	512 KiB (per core)	2 MiB	1.0	95 W	F (1207)	September 10, 2007	OS8350WAL4BGD	$1,019
8350	BA	4	2.0 GHz	512 KiB (per core)	2 MiB	1.0	95 W	F (1207)	September 10, 2007	OS8350WAL4BGE	$1,019
8350	B3	4	2.0 GHz	512 KiB (per core)	2 MiB	1.0	95 W	F (1207)	April 9, 2008	OS8350WAL4BGH	$1,019
8352	B2	4	2.1 GHz	512 KiB (per core)	2 MiB	1.0	95 W	F (1207)	April 9, 2008	OS8350WAL4BGC	
8352	B3	4	2.1 GHz	512 KiB (per core)	2 MiB	1.0	95 W	F (1207)	April 9, 2008	OS8350WAL4BGD	
8354	B2	4	2.2 GHz	512 KiB (per core)	2 MiB	1.0	95 W	F (1207)	April 9, 2008	OS8354WAL4BGD	$1,165
8354	B3	4	2.2 GHz	512 KiB (per core)	2 MiB	1.0	95 W	F (1207)	April 9, 2008	OS8354WAL4BGH	$1,165
8356	B2	4	2.3 GHz	512 KiB (per core)	2 MiB	1.0	95 W	F (1207)	April 9, 2008	OS8356WAL4BGD	$1,514
8356	B3	4	2.3 GHz	512 KiB (per core)	2 MiB	1.0	95 W	F (1207)	April 9, 2008	OS8356WAL4BGH	$1,514
8358 SE	B2	4	2.4 GHz	512 KiB (per core)	2 MiB	1.0	119 W	F (1207)	June 9, 2008	OS8358YAL4BGD	$1,865
8358 SE	B3	4	2.4 GHz	512 KiB (per core)	2 MiB	1.0	119 W	F (1207)	June 9, 2008	OS8358YAL4BGH	$1,865
8360 SE	B2	4	2.5 GHz	512 KiB (per core)	2 MiB	1.0	119 W	F (1207)	June 9, 2008	OS8360YAL4BGD	$2,149
8360 SE	B3	4	2.5 GHz	512 KiB (per core)	2 MiB	1.0	119 W	F (1207)	June 9, 2008	OS8360YAL4BGH	$2,149
8346 HE	B1	4	1.8 GHz	512 KiB (per core)	2 MiB	1.0	79 W	F (1207)	September 10, 2007	OS8346PAL4BGC	$698
8346 HE	B2	4	1.8 GHz	512 KiB (per core)	2 MiB	1.0	79 W	F (1207)	September 10, 2007	OS8346PAL4BGD	$698
8346 HE	BA	4	1.8 GHz	512 KiB (per core)	2 MiB	1.0	79 W	F (1207)	September 10, 2007	OS8346PAL4BGE	$698
8346 HE	B3	4	1.8 GHz	512 KiB (per core)	2 MiB	1.0	79 W	F (1207)	May, 2008	OS8346PAL4BGH	$698
8347 HE	B2	4	1.9 GHz	512 KiB (per core)	2 MiB	1.0	79 W	F (1207)	September 10, 2007	OS8347PAL4BGD	$873
8347 HE	BA	4	1.9 GHz	512 KiB (per core)	2 MiB	1.0	79 W	F (1207)	September 10, 2007	OS8347PAL4BGE	$873
8347 HE	B3	4	1.9 GHz	512 KiB (per core)	2 MiB	1.0	79 W	F (1207)	May, 2008	OS8347PAL4BGH	$873
8350 HE	B3	4	2.0 GHz	512 KiB (per core)	2 MiB	1.0	79 W	F (1207)	October, 2008	OS8350PAL4BGH	$873

=== Quad-core Opteron (45nm) ===
- All models support the x86-64 "baseline" profile
- All models support additionally: Enhanced 3DNow!, SSE3, SSE4a, ABM, NX bit, AMD-V with nested paging

==== 1300-series "Suzuka" ====
- Socket AM3 platform, Socket F for select models, single-processor only
- Socket AM3 models support up to dual-channel Unbuffered PC3-10600 DDR3 SDRAM
- Socket F models support up to dual-channel Registered PC2-6400 DDR2 SDRAM

Model number	Step.	Cores	Clock	L2 cache	L3 cache	HT (GHz)	TDP(W)	Socket	Release date	Part number	Release price (USD)
Quad-core
1381	C2	4	2.5 GHz	512 KiB (per core)	6 MiB	2.2	115 W	AM3	June 2009	OS1381WGK4DGI	$189
1385	C2	4	2.7 GHz	512 KiB (per core)	6 MiB	2.2	115 W	AM3	June 2009	OS1385WGK4DGI	$229
1389	C2	4	2.9 GHz	512 KiB (per core)	6 MiB	2.2	115 W	AM3	June 2009	OS1389WGK4DGI	$269
Quad-core, Socket F
13KS EE	C2	4	2.0 GHz	512 KiB (per core)	6 MiB	2.0	50 W	F (1207)	22 April 2009	OE13KSFLP4DGIE	OEM
13QS HE	C2	4	2.4 GHz	512 KiB (per core)	6 MiB	2.0	71 W	F (1207)	22 April 2009	OE13QSMAP4DGIE	OEM

==== 2300 series "Shanghai" ====
- Socket F platform
- All models support up to two-processor configurations
- All models support up to dual-channel Registered PC2-6400 DDR2 SDRAM

Model number	Step.	Cores	Clock	L2 cache	L3 cache	HT (GHz)	TDP	Socket	Release date	Part number	Release price (USD)
Quad-core
23KS EE	C2	4	2.0 GHz	512 KiB (per core)	6 MiB	2.0	50 W	F (1207)	April 22, 2009	OE23KSFLP4DGIE	OEM
2372 HE	C2	4	2.1 GHz	512 KiB (per core)	6 MiB	1.0	79 W	F (1207)	January 26, 2009	OS2372PAL4DGI	$316
2373 EE	C2	4	2.1 GHz	512 KiB (per core)	6 MiB	2.0	60 W	F (1207)	April 22, 2009	OS2373NAP4DGI	$377
2374 HE	C2	4	2.2 GHz	512 KiB (per core)	6 MiB	1.0	79 W	F (1207)	January 26, 2009	OS2374PAL4DGI	$450
2376	C2	4	2.3 GHz	512 KiB (per core)	6 MiB	1.0	115 W	F (1207)	November 13, 2008	OS2376WAL4DGI	$377
2376 HE	C2	4	2.3 GHz	512 KiB (per core)	6 MiB	1.0	79 W	F (1207)	January 26, 2009	OS2376PAL4DGI	$575
2377 EE	C2	4	2.3 GHz	512 KiB (per core)	6 MiB	2.0	60 W	F (1207)	April 22, 2009	OS2377NAP4DGI	$698
2378	C2	4	2.4 GHz	512 KiB (per core)	6 MiB	1.0	115 W	F (1207)	November 13, 2008	OS2378WAL4DGI	$523
2379 HE	C2	4	2.4 GHz	512 KiB (per core)	6 MiB	2.0	79 W	F (1207)	April 22, 2009	OS2379PCP4DGI	$450
23QS HE	C2	4	2.4 GHz	512 KiB (per core)	6 MiB	2.0	71 W	F (1207)	April 22, 2009	OE23QSMAP4DGIE	OEM
2380	C2	4	2.5 GHz	512 KiB (per core)	6 MiB	1.0	115 W	F (1207)	November 13, 2008	OS2380WAL4DGI	$698
2381 HE	C2	4	2.5 GHz	512 KiB (per core)	6 MiB	2.0	79 W	F (1207)	April 22, 2009	OS2381PCP4DGI	$575
2382	C2	4	2.6 GHz	512 KiB (per core)	6 MiB	1.0	115 W	F (1207)	November 13, 2008	OS2382WAL4DGI	$873
2384	C2	4	2.7 GHz	512 KiB (per core)	6 MiB	1.0	115 W	F (1207)	November 13, 2008	OS2384WAL4DGI	$989
2386 SE	C2	4	2.8 GHz	512 KiB (per core)	6 MiB	1.0	137 W	F (1207)	January 26, 2009	OS2386YAL4DGI	$1,165
23VS	C2	4	2.8 GHz	512 KiB (per core)	6 MiB	2.0	115 W	F (1207)	April 22, 2009	OE23VSWHP4DGIE	OEM
2387	C2	4	2.8 GHz	512 KiB (per core)	6 MiB	2.2	115 W	F (1207)	April 22, 2009	OS2387WHP4DGI	$873
2389	C2	4	2.9 GHz	512 KiB (per core)	6 MiB	2.2	115 W	F (1207)	April 22, 2009	OS2389WHP4DGI	$989
2393 SE	C2	4	3.1 GHz	512 KiB (per core)	6 MiB	2.2	137 W	F (1207)	April 22, 2009	OS2393YCP4DGI	$1,165

==== 8300 series "Shanghai" ====
- Socket F platform
- All models support up to eight-processor configurations
- All models support up to dual-channel Registered PC2-6400 DDR2 SDRAM

Model number	Step.	Cores	Clock	L2 cache	L3 cache	HT (GHz)	TDP	Socket	Release date	Part number	Release price (USD)
Quad Core
8374 HE	C2	4	2.2 GHz	512 KiB (per core)	6 MiB	1.0	79 W	F (1207)	January 26, 2009	OS8374PAL4DGI	$1,165
8376 HE	C2	4	2.3 GHz	512 KiB (per core)	6 MiB	1.0	79 W	F (1207)	January 26, 2009	OS8376PAL4DGI	$1,514
8378	C2	4	2.4 GHz	512 KiB (per core)	6 MiB	1.0	115 W	F (1207)	November 13, 2008	OS8378WAL4DGI	$1,165
8379 HE	C2	4	2.4 GHz	512 KiB (per core)	6 MiB	2.0	79 W	F (1207)	April 22, 2009	OS8379PCP4DGI	$1,165
83QS HE	C2	4	2.4 GHz	512 KiB (per core)	6 MiB	2.0	71 W	F (1207)	April 22, 2009	OE83QSMAP4DGIE	OEM
8380	C2	4	2.5 GHz	512 KiB (per core)	6 MiB	1.0	115 W	F (1207)	November 13, 2008	OS8380WAL4DGI	$1,514
8381 HE	C2	4	2.5 GHz	512 KiB (per core)	6 MiB	2.0	79 W	F (1207)	April 22, 2009	OS8381PCP4DGI	$1,514
8382	C2	4	2.6 GHz	512 KiB (per core)	6 MiB	1.0	115 W	F (1207)	November 13, 2008	OS8382WAL4DGI	$1,865
8384	C2	4	2.7 GHz	512 KiB (per core)	6 MiB	1.0	115 W	F (1207)	November 13, 2008	OS8384WAL4DGI	$2,149
8386 SE	C2	4	2.8 GHz	512 KiB (per core)	6 MiB	1.0	137 W	F (1207)	January 26, 2009	OS8386YAL4DGI	$2,649
83VS	C2	4	2.8 GHz	512 KiB (per core)	6 MiB	2.0	115 W	F (1207)	April 22, 2009	OE83VSWHP4DGIE	OEM
8387	C2	4	2.8 GHz	512 KiB (per core)	6 MiB	2.2	115 W	F (1207)	April 22, 2009	OS8387WHP4DGI	$2,149
8389	C2	4	2.9 GHz	512 KiB (per core)	6 MiB	2.2	115 W	F (1207)	April 22, 2009	OS8389WHP4DGI	$2,649
8393 SE	C2	4	3.1 GHz	512 KiB (per core)	6 MiB	2.2	137 W	F (1207)	April 22, 2009	OS8393YCP4DGI	$2,649

=== Six-core Opteron (45 nm) ===
- All models support the x86-64 "baseline" profile
- All models support additionally: Enhanced 3DNow!, SSE3, SSE4a, ABM, NX bit, AMD-V with nested paging
- All models support HT Assist which reduces cache coherence snoops traffic. When enabled, 1 MiB of L3 cache on each chip is used as a cache coherence directory.

==== 2400 series "Istanbul" ====
- Socket F platform
- All models support up to two-processor configurations
- All models support up to dual-channel Registered PC2-6400 DDR2 SDRAM

Model number	Step.	Cores	Clock	L2 cache	L3 cache	HT (GHz)	TDP	Socket	Release date	Part number	Release price (USD)
Six-core
2419	D0	6	1.8 GHz	512 KiB (per core)	6 MiB	2.4	115 W	F (1207)	June 2, 2009	OS2419WJS6DGN	
2419 EE	D0	6	1.8 GHz	512 KiB (per core)	6 MiB	2.4	60 W	F (1207)	August 31, 2009	OS2419NBS6DGN	$989
2423 HE	D0	6	2.0 GHz	512 KiB (per core)	6 MiB	2.4	79 W	F (1207)	July 13, 2009	OS2423PDS6DGN	$455
2425 HE	D0	6	2.1 GHz	512 KiB (per core)	6 MiB	2.4	79 W	F (1207)	July 13, 2009	OS2425PDS6DGN	$523
2427	D0	6	2.2 GHz	512 KiB (per core)	6 MiB	2.4	115 W	F (1207)	June 2, 2009	OS2427WJS6DGN	$455
2431	D0	6	2.4 GHz	512 KiB (per core)	6 MiB	2.4	115 W	F (1207)	June 2, 2009	OS2431WJS6DGN	$698
2435	D0	6	2.6 GHz	512 KiB (per core)	6 MiB	2.4	115 W	F (1207)	June 2, 2009	OS2435WJS6DGN	$989
2439 SE	D0	6	2.8 GHz	512 KiB (per core)	6 MiB	2.4	137 W	F (1207)	July 13, 2009	OS2439YDS6DGN	$1,019

==== 8400 series "Istanbul" ====
- Socket F platform
- All models support up to eight-processor configurations
- All models support up to dual-channel Registered PC2-6400 DDR2 SDRAM

Model number	Step.	Cores	Clock	L2 cache	L3 cache	HT (GHz)	TDP	Socket	Release date	Part number	Release price (USD)
Six-core
8419	D0	6	1.8 GHz	512 KiB (per core)	6 MiB	2.4	115 W	F (1207)	2 June 2009	OS8419WJS6DGN	
8419 EE	D0	6	1.8 GHz	512 KiB (per core)	6 MiB	2.4	60 W	F (1207)	2 June 2009	OS8419NBS6DGN	
8423	D0	6	2.0 GHz	512 KiB (per core)	6 MiB	2.4	115 W	F (1207)	2 June 2009	OS8423WJS6DGN	
8425 HE	D0	6	2.1 GHz	512 KiB (per core)	6 MiB	2.4	79 W	F (1207)	13 July 2009	OS8425PDS6DGN	$1,514
8431	D0	6	2.4 GHz	512 KiB (per core)	6 MiB	2.4	115 W	F (1207)	2 June 2009	OS8431WJS6DGN	$2,149
8435	D0	6	2.6 GHz	512 KiB (per core)	6 MiB	2.4	115 W	F (1207)	2 June 2009	OS8435WJS6DGN	$2,649
8439 SE	D0	6	2.8 GHz	512 KiB (per core)	6 MiB	2.4	137 W	F (1207)	13 July 2009	OS8439YDS6DGN	$2,649

=== C32 & G34 (45 nm) ===
- All models support the x86-64 "baseline" profile
- All models support additionally: Enhanced 3DNow!, SSE3, SSE4a, ABM, NX bit, AMD-V with nested paging
- All models support HT Assist to reduce cache coherence snooping traffic. When enabled, 1 MiB of L3 cache on each chip is used as a cache coherence directory.

==== 4100 series "Lisbon" ====
- Socket C32 platform
- All models support up to two-processor configurations
- All models support up to dual-channel Registered PC3-10600 DDR3 SDRAM

Model number	Step.	Cores	Freq.	Cache		HT (GHz)	TDP	Socket	Release Date	Part number	Release price (USD)
Model number	Step.	Cores	Freq.	L2	L3	HT (GHz)	TDP	Socket	Release Date	Part number	Release price (USD)
Quad-core
4105	D0	4	1.2 GHz	512 KiB (per core)	6 MiB	3.2	95 W	C32	--	OS4105WLU4DGN	OEM
4122	D0	4	2.2 GHz	512 KiB (per core)	6 MiB	3.2	95 W	C32	June 23, 2010	OS4122WLU4DGN	$99
41LE HE	D0	4	2.3 GHz	512 KiB (per core)	6 MiB	2.2	65 W	C32	--	OE41LEOHU4DGOE	OEM
41QS HE	D0	4	2.5 GHz	512 KiB (per core)	6 MiB	2.2	65 W	C32	--	OE41QSOHU4DGOE	OEM
4130	D0	4	2.6 GHz	512 KiB (per core)	6 MiB	3.2	95 W	C32	June 23, 2010	OS4130WLU4DGN	$125
4133	D0	4	2.8 GHz	512 KiB (per core)	6 MiB	3.2	95 W	C32		OS4133WLU4DGO	
Six-core
4162 EE	D1	6	1.7 GHz	512 KiB (per core)	6 MiB	3.2	35 W	C32	June 23, 2010	OS4162HJU6DGO	$316
41GL EE	D1	6	1.8 GHz	512 KiB (per core)	6 MiB	2.2	40 W	C32	--	OE41GLHKU6DGOE	OEM
4164 EE	D1	6	1.8 GHz	512 KiB (per core)	6 MiB	3.2	35 W	C32	June 23, 2010	OS4164HJU6DGO	$698
4170 HE	D1	6	2.1 GHz	512 KiB (per core)	6 MiB	3.2	65 W	C32	June 23, 2010	OS4170OFU6DGO	$174
4171 HE	D1	6	2.1 GHz	512 KiB (per core)	6 MiB	3.2	50 W	C32	--	OS4171FNU6DGO	OEM
41KX HE	D1	6	2.2 GHz	512 KiB (per core)	6 MiB	2.2	65 W	C32	--	OE41KXOHU6DGOE	OEM
4174 HE	D1	6	2.3 GHz	512 KiB (per core)	6 MiB	3.2	65 W	C32	June 23, 2010	OS4174OFU6DGO	$255
4176 HE	D1	6	2.4 GHz	512 KiB (per core)	6 MiB	3.2	65 W	C32	June 23, 2010	OS4176OFU6DGO	$377
4180	D1	6	2.6 GHz	512 KiB (per core)	6 MiB	3.2	95 W	C32	June 23, 2010	OS4180WLU6DGO	$188
4184	D1	6	2.8 GHz	512 KiB (per core)	6 MiB	3.2	95 W	C32	June 23, 2010	OS4184WLU6DGO	$316

==== 6100 series "Magny-Cours" ====
- Socket G34 platform
- All models use a Multi-Chip module (MCM) design with two dies in each package
- All models support up to four-processor configurations
- All models support up to four-channel Registered PC3-10600 DDR3 SDRAM

Model number	Step.	Cores	Core config	Freq.	Cache		HT (GHz)	Voltage	TDP	Socket	Release Date	Part number	Release price (USD)
Model number	Step.	Cores	Core config	Freq.	L2	L3	HT (GHz)	Voltage	TDP	Socket	Release Date	Part number	Release price (USD)
Eight-core
6124 HE	D1	8	2 x 4	1.8 GHz	512 KiB (per core)	2× 6 MiB	3.2	1.2 V	85 W	G34	March 29, 2010	OS6124VAT8EGO	$455
61KS	D1	8	2 x 4	2.0 GHz	512 KiB (per core)	2× 6 MiB	3.2	1.3 V	115 W	G34	---	OE61KSWKT8EGO	OEM
6128	D1	8	2 x 4	2.0 GHz	512 KiB (per core)	2× 6 MiB	3.2	1.3 V	115 W	G34	March 29, 2010	OS6128WKT8EGO	$266
6128 HE	D1	8	2 x 4	2.0 GHz	512 KiB (per core)	2× 6 MiB	3.2	1.2 V	85 W	G34	March 29, 2010	OS6128VAT8EGO	$523
6132 HE	D1	8	2 x 4	2.2 GHz	512 KiB (per core)	2× 6 MiB	3.2	1.2 V	85 W	G34	February 14, 2011	OS6132VAT8EGO	$591
61QS	D1	8	2 x 4	2.3 GHz	512 KiB (per core)	2× 6 MiB	3.2	1.3 V	115 W	G34	---	OE61QSWKT8EGO	OEM
6134	D1	8	2 x 4	2.3 GHz	512 KiB (per core)	2× 6 MiB	3.2	1.3 V	115 W	G34	March 29, 2010	OS6134WKT8EGO	$523
6136	D1	8	2 x 4	2.4 GHz	512 KiB (per core)	2× 6 MiB	3.2	1.3 V	115 W	G34	March 29, 2010	OS6136WKT8EGO	$744
6140	D1	8	2 x 4	2.6 GHz	512 KiB (per core)	2× 6 MiB	3.2	1.3 V	115 W	G34	February 14, 2011	OS6140WKT8EGO	$989
Twelve-core
6164 HE	D1	12	2 x 6	1.7 GHz	512 KiB (per core)	2× 6 MiB	3.2	1.075 V	85 W	G34	March 29, 2010	OS6164VATCEGO	$744
6166 HE	D1	12	2 x 6	1.8 GHz	512 KiB (per core)	2× 6 MiB	3.2	1.075 V	85 W	G34	February 14, 2011	OS6166VATCEGO	$873
6168	D1	12	2 x 6	1.9 GHz	512 KiB (per core)	2× 6 MiB	3.2	1.1875 V	115 W	G34	March 29, 2010	OS6168WKTCEGO	$744
6172	D1	12	2 x 6	2.1 GHz	512 KiB (per core)	2× 6 MiB	3.2	1.1875 V	115 W	G34	March 29, 2010	OS6172WKTCEGO	$989
6174	D1	12	2 x 6	2.2 GHz	512 KiB (per core)	2× 6 MiB	3.2	1.1875 V	115 W	G34	March 29, 2010	OS6174WKTCEGO	$1,165
6176 SE	D1	12	2 x 6	2.3 GHz	512 KiB (per core)	2× 6 MiB	3.2	1.25 V	140 W	G34	March 29, 2010	OS6176YETCEGO	$1,386
6176	D1	12	2 x 6	2.3 GHz	512 KiB (per core)	2× 6 MiB	3.2	1.1875 V	115 W	G34	February 14, 2011	OS6176WKTCEGO	$1,265
6180 SE	D1	12	2 x 6	2.5 GHz	512 KiB (per core)	2× 6 MiB	3.2	1.25 V	140 W	G34	February 14, 2011	OS6180YETCEGO	$1,514

== Bulldozer based Opterons ==
=== 3200-, 4200- & 6200-series Opterons ===
==== Opteron 3200-series "Zurich" (32 nm) ====
- All models support: MMX, SSE, SSE2, SSE3, SSSE3, SSE4.1, SSE4.2, SSE4a, IOMMU, NX bit, AMD64, AMD-V, AES, CLMUL, AVX, CVT16–F16C, XOP, FMA4.
- All models support single socket configurations
- Memory support: Up to 4 DIMMs per socket
- Memory controller: Two channels of UDDR3, RDDR3 up to PC3-15000
- Die size: 315 mm^{2}

Model Number	Step.	Cores	Frequency (GHz)			Cache		HT (GHz)	Multi	TDP (W)	Socket	Released	Part number	Release price (USD)
Model Number	Step.	Cores	Base	Full Load turbo	Half Load turbo	L2	L3 (MB)	HT (GHz)	Multi	TDP (W)	Socket	Released	Part number	Release price (USD)
B2, Four core, high-efficiency
3250 HE	B2	4	2.5	2.8	3.5	2 × 2 MB	4	2.6	12.5–17.5×	45	AM3+	20 March 2012	OS3250HOW4MGU	$99
3260 HE	B2	4	2.7	3.0	3.7	2 × 2 MB	4	2.6	13.5–18.5×	45	AM3+	20 March 2012	OS3260HOW4MGU	$125
B2, Eight core, high-efficiency
3280	B2	8	2.4	2.7	3.5	4 × 2 MB	8	2.6	12–17.5×	65	AM3+	20 March 2012	OS3280OLW8KGU	$229

==== Opteron 4200-series "Valencia" (32 nm) ====
- All models support: MMX, SSE, SSE2, SSE3, SSSE3, SSE4.1, SSE4.2, SSE4a, NX bit, AMD64, AMD-V, AES, CLMUL, AVX, XOP, FMA4.
- All models support up to two socket configurations
- Memory support: Up to 4 DIMMs per socket
- Memory controller: Two channels of UDDR3, RDDR3 up to PC3-12800

Model Number	Step.	Cores	Frequency (GHz)			Cache		HT (GHz)	Multi	TDP (W)	Socket	Released	Part number	Release price (USD)
Model Number	Step.	Cores	Base	Full Load turbo	Half Load turbo	L2	L3 (MB)	HT (GHz)	Multi	TDP (W)	Socket	Released	Part number	Release price (USD)
B2, Quad core, energy-efficient
42DX EE	B2	4	2.2		3.3	2 × 2 MB	8	3.2	11–16.5×	40	C32	November 14, 2011	OE42DXHKU4KGU	
B2, Six core
4226	B2	6	2.7	2.9	3.1	3 × 2 MB	8	3.2	13.5–15.5×	95	C32	November 14, 2011	OS4226WLU6KGU	$125
4234	B2	6	3.1	3.3	3.5	3 × 2 MB	8	3.2	15.5–17.5×	95	C32	November 14, 2011	OS4234WLU6KGU	$174
4238	B2	6	3.3	3.5	3.7	3 × 2 MB	8	3.2	16.5–18.5×	95	C32	November 14, 2011	OS4238WLU6KGU	$255
4240	B2	6	3.4	3.6	3.8	3 × 2 MB	8	3.2	17–19×	95	C32	May 1, 2012	OS4240WLU6KGU	$316
B2, Six core, high-efficiency
4228 HE	B2	6	2.8	3.1	3.6	3 × 2 MB	8	3.2	14–18×	65	C32	November 14, 2011	OS4228OFU6KGU	$255
4230 HE	B2	6	2.9	3.2	3.7	3 × 2 MB	8	3.2	14.5–18.5×	65	C32	May 1, 2012	OS4230OFU6KGU	$377
B2, Eight core
4280	B2	8	2.8	3.1	3.5	4 × 2 MB	8	3.2	14–17.5×	95	C32	November 14, 2011	OS4280WLU8KGU	$255
4284	B2	8	3.0	3.3	3.7	4 × 2 MB	8	3.2	15–18.5×	95	C32	November 14, 2011	OS4284WLU8KGU	$316
B2, Eight core, high-efficiency
42MX HE	B2	8	2.2		3.3	4 × 2 MB	8	3.2	11–16.5×	65	C32	November 14, 2011	OE42MXOHU8KGU	
4274 HE	B2	8	2.5	2.8	3.5	4 × 2 MB	8	3.2	12.5×-17.5×	65	C32	November 14, 2011	OS4274OFU8KGU	$377
4276 HE	B2	8	2.6	2.9	3.6	4 × 2 MB	8	3.2	13–18×	65	C32	May 1, 2012	OS4276OFU8KGU	$455
B2, Eight core, energy-efficient
4256 EE	B2	8	1.6	1.9	2.8	4 × 2 MB	8	3.2	8–14×	35	C32	November 14, 2011	OS4256HJU8KGU	$377

==== Opteron 6200-series "Interlagos" (32 nm) ====
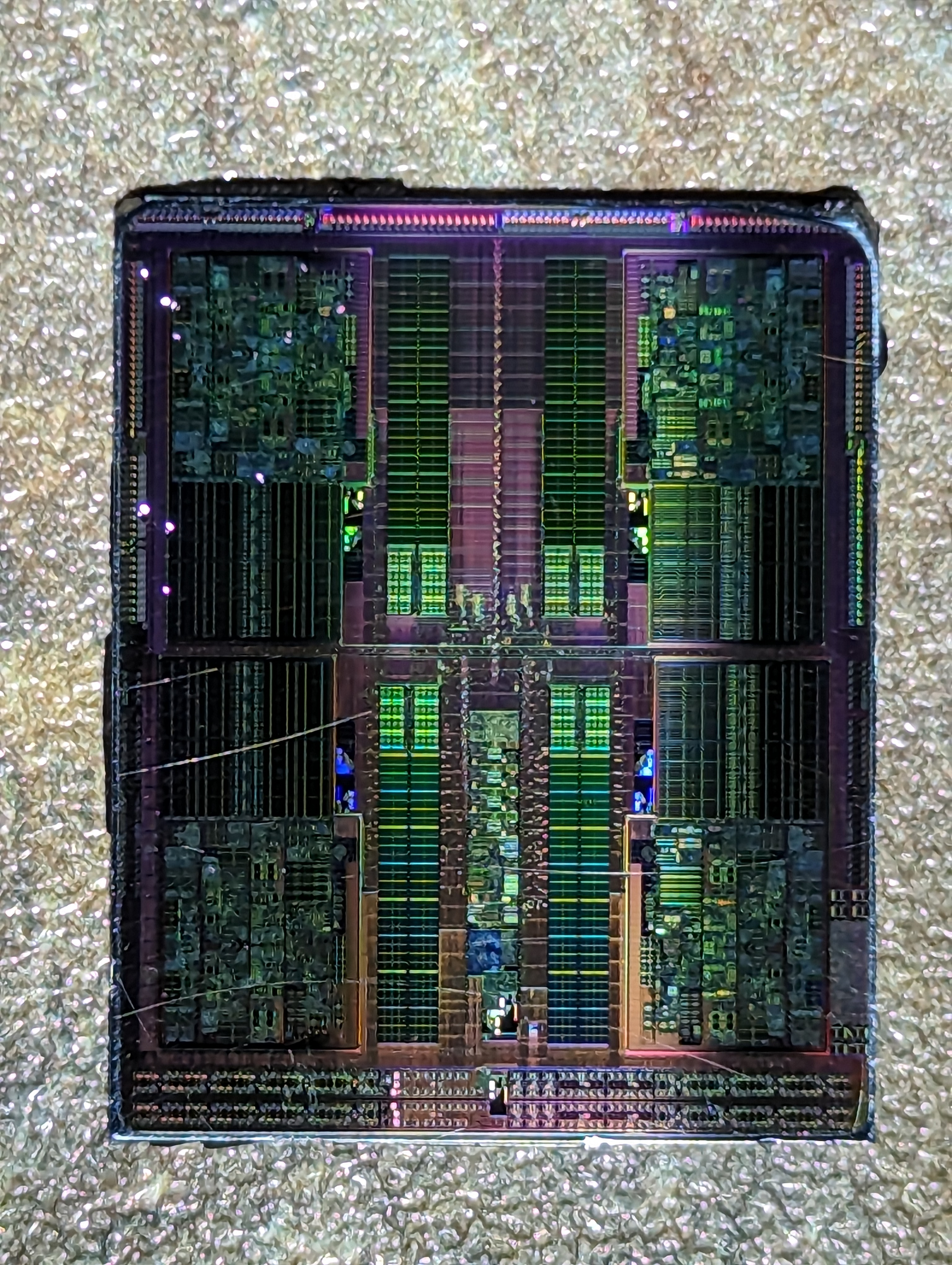
AMD Opteron 6212 die

- All models support: MMX, SSE, SSE2, SSE3, SSSE3, SSE4.1, SSE4.2, SSE4a, NX bit, AMD64, AMD-V, AES, CLMUL, AVX, XOP, FMA4.
- All models support two or four socket configurations
- Memory support: Up to 12 DIMMs per socket
- Memory controller: Four channels of UDDR3, RDDR3 up to PC3-12800
- Interlagos models have 16 MB of L3 cache (2x8 MB) but only 14 MB is visible with the HT Assist feature activated using 2 MB as a directory cache.

Model Number	Step.	Cores	Frequency (GHz)			Cache		HT (GHz)	Multi	TDP (W)	Socket	Released	Part number	Release price (USD)
Model Number	Step.	Cores	Base	Full Load turbo	Half Load turbo	L2	L3	HT (GHz)	Multi	TDP (W)	Socket	Released	Part number	Release price (USD)
B2, Quad core
6204	B2	4	3.3	—N/a	—N/a	2 × 2 MB	2 × 8 MB	3.2	16.5×	115	G34	November 14, 2011	OS6204WKT4GGU	$455
B2, Eight core
6212	B2	8	2.6	2.9	3.2	4 × 2 MB	2 × 8 MB	3.2	13–16×	115	G34	November 14, 2011	OS6212WKT8GGU	$266
6220	B2	8	3.0	3.3	3.6	4 × 2 MB	2 × 8 MB	3.2	15–18×	115	G34	November 14, 2011	OS6220WKT8GGU	$523
B2, Twelve core
6234	B2	12	2.4	2.7	3.0	6 × 2 MB	2 × 8 MB	3.2	12–15×	115	G34	November 14, 2011	OS6234WKTCGGU	$377
6238	B2	12	2.6	2.9	3.2	6 × 2 MB	2 × 8 MB	3.2	13–16×	115	G34	November 14, 2011	OS6238WKTCGGU	$455
B2, Twelve core, high-efficiency
6230 HE	B2	12	2.2	2.5	3.1	6 × 2 MB	2 × 8 MB	3.2	11–15.5×	85	G34	May 1, 2012	OS6230VATCGGU	$639
B2, Sixteen core
6272	B2	16	2.1	2.4	3.0	8 × 2 MB	2 × 8 MB	3.2	10.5–15×	115	G34	November 14, 2011	OS6272WKTGGGU	$523
6274	B2	16	2.2	2.5	3.1	8 × 2 MB	2 × 8 MB	3.2	11–15.5×	115	G34	November 14, 2011	OS6274WKTGGGU	$639
6275 "Fangio"	B2	16	2.3	?	3.2	8 × 2 MB	2 × 8 MB	3.2	11–15.5×	115	G34	?	OS6275WKTGGGU	?
6276	B2	16	2.3	2.6	3.2	8 × 2 MB	2 × 8 MB	3.2	11.5–16×	115	G34	November 14, 2011	OS6276WKTGGGU	$788
6278	B2	16	2.4	2.7	3.3	8 × 2 MB	2 × 8 MB	3.2	12–16.5×	115	G34	May 1, 2012	OS6278WKTGGGU	$988
6282 SE	B2	16	2.6	3.0	3.3	8 × 2 MB	2 × 8 MB	3.2	13-16.5×	140	G34	November 14, 2011	OS6282YETGGGU	$1,019
6284 SE	B2	16	2.7	3.1	3.4	8 × 2 MB	2 × 8 MB	3.2	13.5–17×	140	G34	May 1, 2012	OS6284YETGGGU	$1,265
6287 SE	B2	16	2.8	3.2	3.5	8 × 2 MB	2 × 8 MB	3.2	14–17.5×	140	G34	?	OS6287YITGGGU	?
6291 SE	B2	16	3.0	3.2	4.0	8 × 2 MB	2 × 8 MB	3.2	14–17.5×	140	G34	?	ZS629157TGGGU	?
B2, Sixteen core, high-efficiency
6262 HE	B2	16	1.6	2.1	2.9	8 × 2 MB	2 × 8 MB	3.2	8–14.5×	85	G34	November 14, 2011	OS6262VATGGGU	$523

== Piledriver based Opterons ==
=== 3300-, 4300- & 6300-series Opterons ===
==== Opteron 3300-series "Delhi" (32 nm) ====
- All models support: MMX, SSE, SSE2, SSE3, SSSE3, SSE4.1, SSE4.2, SSE4a, NX bit, AMD64, AMD-V, AES, CLMUL, AVX, XOP, FMA3, FMA4, CVT16–F16C, AMD Turbo Core3.0., ECC
- All models support single socket configurations
- Memory support: Up to 4 DIMMs per socket
- Memory controller: Two channels of UDDR3, RDDR3 up to PC3-15000
- Die size: 315 mm^{2}

Model Number	Step.	Cores	Frequency (GHz)			Cache		HT (GHz)	Multi	TDP (W)	Socket	Released	Part number	Release price (USD)
Model Number	Step.	Cores	Base	Full Load turbo	Half Load turbo	L2	L3 (MB)	HT (GHz)	Multi	TDP (W)	Socket	Released	Part number	Release price (USD)
C0, Four core, energy-efficient
3320 EE	C0	4	1.9	2.1	2.5	2 × 2 MB	8	2.6	9.5–12.5×	25	AM3+	4 December 2012	OS3320SJW4KHK	$174
C0, Four core, high-efficiency
3350 HE	C0	4	2.8	3.1	3.8	2 × 2 MB	8	2.6	14–19×	45	AM3+	4 December 2012	OS3350HOW4KHK	$125
C0, Eight core, high-efficiency
3365	C0	8	2.3	2.6	3.3	4 × 2 MB	8	2.6	11.5–16.5×	65	AM3+	July 2013	OS3365OLW8KHK	
3380	C0	8	2.6	2.9	3.6	4 × 2 MB	8	2.6	13–18×	65	AM3+	4 December 2012	OS3380OLW8KHK	$229

==== Opteron 4300-series "Seoul" (32 nm) ====
- All models support: MMX, SSE, SSE2, SSE3, SSSE3, SSE4.1, SSE4.2, SSE4a, NX bit, AMD64, AMD-V, AES, CLMUL, AVX, XOP, FMA3, FMA4, CVT16–F16C, AMD Turbo Core, ECC
- All models support up to two socket configurations
- Memory support: Up to 4 DIMMs per socket
- Memory controller: Two channels of UDDR3, RDDR3 up to PC3-15000

Model Number	Step.	Cores	Frequency (GHz)			Cache		HT (GHz)	Multi	TDP (W)	Socket	Released	Part number	Release price (USD)
Model Number	Step.	Cores	Base	Full Load turbo	Half Load turbo	L2	L3 (MB)	HT (GHz)	Multi	TDP (W)	Socket	Released	Part number	Release price (USD)
C0, Quad core, energy-efficient
43CX EE	C0	4	2.2		3.0	2 × 2 MB	8	3.2	11–15×	35	C32	December 4, 2012	OE43CXHPU4KHK	
4310 EE	C0	4	2.2		3.0	2 × 2 MB	8	3.2	11–15×	35	C32	December 4, 2012	OS4310HPU4KHK	$415
C0, Six core
4334	C0	6	3.1	3.3	3.5	3 × 2 MB	8	3.2	15.5–17.5×	95	C32	December 4, 2012	OS4334WLU6KHK	$191
4340	C0	6	3.5	3.7	3.8	3 × 2 MB	8	3.2	17.5–19×	95	C32	December 4, 2012	OS4340WLU6KHK	$348
C0, Six core, high-efficiency
4332 HE	C0	6	3.0	3.3	3.7	3 × 2 MB	8	3.2	15–18.5×	65	C32	December 4, 2012	OS4332OFU6KHK	$415
C0, Eight core
4386	C0	8	3.1	3.4	3.8	4 × 2 MB	8	3.2	15.5–19×	95	C32	December 4, 2012	OS4386WLU8KHK	$348
C0, Eight core, energy-efficient
4365 EE	C0	8	2.0	2.3	2.8	4 × 2 MB	8	3.2	10–14×	40	C32	December 4, 2012	OS4365HKU8KHK	
C0, Eight core, high-efficiency
43GK HE	C0	8	2.6	2.9	3.6	4 × 2 MB	8	3.2	13–18×	65	C32	December 4, 2012	OE43GKOHU8KHK	
4376 HE	C0	8	2.6	2.9	3.6	4 × 2 MB	8	3.2	13–18×	65	C32	December 4, 2012	OS4376OFU8KHK	$501

==== Opteron 6300-series "Abu Dhabi" (32 nm) ====
- All models support: MMX, SSE, SSE2, SSE3, SSSE3, SSE4.1, SSE4.2, SSE4a, NX bit, AMD64, AMD-V, IOMMU, AES, CLMUL, AVX, BMI1 (Bit Manipulation Instructions 1), ABM (Advanced Bit Manipulation), TBM (Trailing Bit Manipulation instructions), XOP, FMA3, FMA4, CVT16–F16C, Turbo Core 2.0, EVP (Enhanced Virus Protection), ECC
- All models support two or four socket configurations
- Memory support: Up to 12 DIMMs per socket
- Memory controller: Four channels of UDDR3, RDDR3 up to PC3-15000
- Abu Dhabi models have 16 MB of L3 cache (2x8 MB) but only 14 MB is visible with the HT Assist feature activated using 2 MB as a directory cache.
- Two new 6300 models code-named "Warsaw" were added in 2014 (6338P and 6370P) that operate at lower clock frequencies using less power.

Model Number	Step.	Cores	Frequency (GHz)			Cache		HT (GHz)	Multi	TDP (W)	Socket	Released	Part number	Release price (USD)
Model Number	Step.	Cores	Base	Full Load turbo	Half Load turbo	L2	L3	HT (GHz)	Multi	TDP (W)	Socket	Released	Part number	Release price (USD)
C0, Quad core
6308	C0	4	3.5	—N/a	—N/a	2 × 2 MB	2 × 8 MB	3.2	17.5×	115	G34	November 5, 2012	OS6308WKT4GHK	$501
C0, Eight core
6320	C0	8	2.8	3.1	3.3	4 × 2 MB	2 × 8 MB	3.2	14–16.5×	115	G34	November 5, 2012	OS6320WKT8GHK	$293
6328	C0	8	3.2	3.5	3.8	4 × 2 MB	2 × 8 MB	3.2	16–19×	115	G34	November 5, 2012	OS6328WKT8GHK	$575
C0, Twelve core
6338P	C0	12	2.3	2.5	2.8	6 × 2 MB	2 × 8 MB	3.2	11.5–14×	99	G34	January 22, 2014	OS6338WQTCGHK	$377
6344	C0	12	2.6	2.9	3.2	6 × 2 MB	2 × 8 MB	3.2	13–16×	115	G34	November 5, 2012	OS6344WKTCGHK	$415
6348	C0	12	2.8	3.1	3.4	6 × 2 MB	2 × 8 MB	3.2	14–17×	115	G34	November 5, 2012	OS6348WKTCGHK	$575
C0, Sixteen core
6370P	C0	16	2.0	2.2	2.5	8 × 2 MB	2 × 8 MB	3.2	10–12.5×	99	G34	January 22, 2014	OS6370WQTGGHK	$598
6376	C0	16	2.3	2.6	3.2	8 × 2 MB	2 × 8 MB	3.2	11.5–16×	115	G34	November 5, 2012	OS6376WKTGGHK	$703
6378	C0	16	2.4	2.7	3.3	8 × 2 MB	2 × 8 MB	3.2	12–16.5×	115	G34	November 5, 2012	OS6378WKTGGHK	$867
6380	C0	16	2.5	2.8	3.4	8 × 2 MB	2 × 8 MB	3.2	12.5–17×	115	G34	November 5, 2012	OS6380WKTGGHK	$1,088
6386 SE	C0	16	2.8	3.2	3.5	8 × 2 MB	2 × 8 MB	3.2	14-17.5×	140	G34	November 5, 2012	OS6386YETGGHK	$1,392
C0, Sixteen core, high-efficiency
6366 HE	C0	16	1.8	2.3	3.1	8 × 2 MB	2 × 8 MB	3.2	9–15.5×	85	G34	November 5, 2012	OS6366VATGGHK	$575

== Excavator based Opterons ==
=== X3000-series Opterons ===
==== Opteron X3000-series "Toronto" (28 nm) ====
- All models support: MMX, SSE, SSE2, SSE3, SSSE3, SSE4.1, SSE4.2, SSE4a, AMD64, AMD-V, AES, CLMUL, AVX, AVX2, XOP, FMA3, FMA4, F16C, ABM, BMI1, BMI2, TBM, RDRAND
- Two or Four CPU cores based on the Excavator microarchitecture
- L1 Cache: 32 KB Data per core and 96 KB Instructions per module
- Memory controller: Two channels of DDR4 SDRAM up to PC4-19200
- GPU based on Graphics Core Next (GCN) 3rd Generation architecture

Model number	Step.	CPU						GPU				DDR4 Memory support	TDP (W)	Socket	Released	Part number	Release price (USD)
Model number	Step.	Cores	Clock (GHz)		L2 cache (MB)	Multi	V_{core}	Model	Compute units	Clock (GHz)		DDR4 Memory support	TDP (W)	Socket	Released	Part number	Release price (USD)
Model number	Step.	Cores	Base	Turbo	L2 cache (MB)	Multi	V_{core}	Model	Compute units	Base	Turbo	DDR4 Memory support	TDP (W)	Socket	Released	Part number	Release price (USD)
X3216	Unknown	2	1.6	3.0	1	Unknown	Unknown	Unknown	4	0.8	—N/a	1600	12–15	BGA (FP4)	June 2017	OX3216AAY23KA	Unknown
X3418	Unknown	4	1.8	3.2	2	Unknown	Unknown	Unknown	6	0.8	—N/a	2400	12–15	BGA (FP4)	June 2017	OX3418AAY43KA	Unknown
X3421	Unknown	4	2.1	3.4	2	Unknown	Unknown	Radeon 7	8	0.8	—N/a	2400	12–15	BGA (FP4)	June 2017	OX3421AAY43KA	Unknown

== Jaguar-based Opterons ==
=== X1100 and X2100 series Opterons ===
==== Opteron X1100-series "Kyoto" (28nm) ====
- Socket FT3 (BGA)
- 4 CPU cores (Jaguar (microarchitecture))
- SSE4.1, SSE4.2, AVX, AES, F16C, BMI1, AMD-V, AMD-P (power management) support
- Turbo Dock Technology, C6 and CC6 low power states
- 128-bit FPU

Model number	Step.	CPU						Memory support	TDP	Released	Part number	Release price (USD)
Model number	Step.	Cores	Clock	Turbo	L2 cache	Multi	V_{core}	Memory support	TDP	Released	Part number	Release price (USD)
X1150	B0	4	2.0 GHz	—N/a	2 MB			DDR3-1600	17 W	May 2013	OX1150IPJ44HM	$64

==== Opteron X2100-series "Kyoto" (28nm) ====
- Socket FT3 (BGA)
- 4 CPU cores (Jaguar (microarchitecture))
- SSE4.1, SSE4.2, AVX, AES, F16C, BMI1 support
- Turbo Dock Technology, C6 and CC6 low power states
- GPU based on Graphics Core Next (GCN) architecture

Model number	Step.	CPU				GPU				Memory support	TDP (W)	Released	Part number	Release price (USD)
Model number	Step.	Cores	Clock (GHz)	Turbo	L2 cache (MB)	Model	Config	Clock (GHz)	Turbo	Memory support	TDP (W)	Released	Part number	Release price (USD)
X2150	B0	4	1.9	—N/a	2	HD 8400		0.6	—N/a	DDR3	22	May 2013	OX2150IAJ44HM	$99
X2170		4	2.4	—N/a	2	HD 8400	128:?:?	0.8	—N/a	DDR3-1866	25	September 2016	OX2170IXJ44JB	

== ARM Cortex A57 based Opterons ==
=== Opteron A1100-series "Seattle" (28nm) ===
The AMD Opteron A1100 is an enterprise-class ARM Cortex-A57-based SOC.

- Up to 64 GB DDR3L-1600 and up to 128GB DDR4-1866 with ECC
- SoC peripherals include 6 × SATA 3, 2 × Integrated 10 GbE LAN and 8 PCI Express lanes in ×8, ×4 and ×2 configurations.

Model number	CPU		Cache		TDP (W)	Release Date	Part number
Model number	Cores	Clock (GHz)	L2	L3 (MB)	TDP (W)	Release Date	Part number
A1120	4	1.7	2× 1 MB	8	25	January 2016	OA1120ARD4NAD
A1150	8	1.7	4× 1 MB	8	32	January 2016	OA1150AQD8NAD
A1170	8	2.0	4× 1 MB	8	32	January 2016	OA1170AQD8NAD

== See also ==
- List of AMD chipsets
- List of AMD processors with 3D graphics
- List of AMD Epyc microprocessors
- List of AMD FX microprocessors
- Table of AMD processors
