= CVT16 =

CVT16 may refer to:

- CVT16 instruction set, an instruction set for the Bulldozer processor produced by AMD due to enter production in 2011
- USS Lexington (CV-16), an aircraft carrier operated by the United States Navy from 1943 until 1991, after which she became a museum ship located in Corpus Christi, Texas
