= Processor supplementary capability =

Feature added to a CPU after the design was introduced to the market

A processor supplementary capability is a feature that has been added to an existing central processing unit (CPU) design after the initial introduction of that design to the marketplace.

A supplementary capability increases the usefulness of the processor design, allowing it to compete more favorably with competitors and giving consumers a reason to upgrade, while retaining backwards compatibility with the original design.

The CPU supplementary instruction capability does not as a rule apply to 8 or 16 bit CPUs, as many of these CPUs are used mostly as microcontrollers. On modern 32 and 64 bit CPUs the processor supplementary capability does not extend to Floating Point Units (FPUs) or Memory Management Units (MMUs) as these are considered to be fundamental core functionalities. Extensions to the core functionalities of the MMU and FPU may be considered CPU extensions however.

== Historical reasoning ==
The supplementary instructions feature has always been assumed to mean fixed sets of instructions that are not obligatory across all CPUs in a CPU family. Supplementary instructions will simply not be found on all processors within that family. A programmer who wishes to use a supplementary feature of a CPU is faced with a couple of choices.

Supplemental instruction programming options

- The operating system (kernel) and systems programmer (programs) may choose to design the systems software so that it mandatorily uses that feature and therefore can only be run on the more recent processors that have that feature.
- On the other hand, the system programmer may write or use existing software libraries to determine whether the processor it is running on has a particular feature (or set of instructions).

Should the needed instructions not be there a fall back to a (presumably slower or otherwise less desirable) alternative technique can be initiated or else the program may be set to run with reduced functionality.

- In other cases, an operating system may mimic the new features for older processors, though often with reduced performance.

By using a lowest common denominator strategy (avoiding use of processor supplementary capabilities), programs can be kept portable across all machines of the same architecture.

=== CPU families affected ===
Some popular processor architectures such as x86, 68000, Power ISA and MIPS have seen many new capabilities introduced over several generations of design.

Some of these capabilities have then seen widespread adoption by programmers, spurring consumer upgrades and making the previous generations of processors obsolete.

== x86 capability flags ==
VME	Virtual 8086 mode Enhancement
DE	Debugging Extensions
PSE	Page Size Extensions
TSC	Time Stamp Counter
MSR	RDMSR and WRMSR Support
PAE	Physical Address Extensions
MCE	Machine Check Exception
CXS	CMPXCHG8B Instruction (also see Double compare-and-swap and Transactional Synchronization Extensions)
APIC	APIC on Chip (also see APIC)
MTRR	Memory Type Range Register
PGE	PTE Global Bit (also see Page table)
MCA	Machine Check Architecture
CMOV	Conditional Move and Compare Instructions (also see FCMOV)

== Supplementary capabilities not represented by flags ==
Include (not full list):

- 3DNow!
- Page Attribute Table (PAT)
- MMX
- SSE (and later variants up to SSE5)
- AVX
- AVX2
- AVX-512

=== Processor Supplementary Instructions ===
Processor Supplementary Instructions are instructions that have been implemented on certain processors within a family, but are not present on all processors within a particular family.

==== IA-32 ====
The following instructions are considered to be processor supplementary instructions on IA-32 architecture. These instructions were added to later production processors, and are not part of the original IA-32 instruction set. Programs containing these instructions may not operate correctly on all machines in the IA-32 family:

bswap	byte swap
cmov	conditional move
cmova
cmovae
cmovb
cmovbe
cmovc
cmove
cmovg
cmovge
cmovl
cmovle
cmovna
cmovnae
cmovnb
cmovnbe
cmovnc
cmovng
cmovnge
cmovnl
cmovnle
cmovno
cmovnp
cmovns
cmovnz
cmovo
cmovp
cmovpe
cmovpo
cmovs
cmovz
cpuid
fcmov	floating point conditional move
fcomi
nopl
rdpmc	read performance monitor counts
rdtsc	read time stamp counter
syscall
sysenter
sysexit
sysret
ud2	an undefined instruction just for software testing
xsave	save processor extended states
xrstor	restore processor extended states

== FPU and MMU capability ==
The FPU (Floating Point Unit) maths co-processing capability is available on all x86 processors since the 80486DX series. The FPU and MMU instruction sets (for the x86 family) have not been considered supplementary instructions since their introduction due to their importance to core CPU functionality.

== See also ==
- x86 instruction listings
- CPUID
