= FMA instruction set =

Extension to the x86 instruction set

The FMA instruction set is an extension to the x86 microprocessor instruction set to perform fused multiply–add (FMA) operations on 128-bit and 256-bit operands. These operations were extended to 512-bit operands by the AVX-512 extension introduced by Intel and later supported by AMD.

There are two incompatible variants of the FMA instruction set. They have the same operations but differ in the number of operands:

- FMA4 is the four-operand variant (three source operands and a destination register). AMD added FMA4 with the Bulldozer (2011) architecture. Zen 1 (2017) processors still execute FMA4 instructions but do not report them as supported through CPUID, and Zen 2 (2019) removed them. Intel originally specified FMA4 in 2008, but changed its design to three operands later that year.
- FMA3 is the three-operand variant (three source operands, one of which is also the destination). AMD added FMA3 with the Piledriver (2012) architecture, for compatibility with Intel's planned Haswell processors. Intel added FMA3, alongside AVX2, with Haswell (2013) processors. Earlier processors, including AMD's Bulldozer and Intel's Sandy Bridge and Ivy Bridge, do not support it. AVX-512 adds 512-bit forms of the FMA3 instructions.

== Operations ==
An FMA operation has the form $d = \operatorname{round}(\pm a \cdot b \pm c)$, where the operands are floating-point scalars or SIMD vectors. The exact value of $\pm a \cdot b \pm c$ is rounded only once to the precision of the destination format (i.e. single or double precision). In the IEEE 754-2008 standard for floating-point arithmetic, the operation is called fusedMultiplyAdd and conforming implementations must provide it. The result is usually more accurate than that of separate multiply and add instructions.

FMA3 and FMA4 have the same six operations. The operations differ only in the signs of the product and of $c$.

FMA operations (each result is rounded once)
Mnemonic	AMD name	Intel name	Operation
VFMADD	Multiply and Add	Fused Multiply-Add	$d = a \cdot b + c$
VFMSUB	Multiply and Subtract	Fused Multiply-Subtract	$d = a \cdot b - c$
VFNMADD	Negative Multiply and Add	Fused Negative Multiply-Add	$d = -(a \cdot b) + c$
VFNMSUB	Negative Multiply and Subtract	Fused Negative Multiply-Subtract	$d = -(a \cdot b) - c$
VFMADDSUB	Multiply with Alternating Add/Subtract	Fused Multiply-Alternating Add/Subtract	$d_i = a_i \cdot b_i - c_i$ for even $i$; $d_i = a_i \cdot b_i + c_i$ for odd $i$
VFMSUBADD	Multiply with Alternating Subtract/Add	Fused Multiply-Alternating Subtract/Add	$d_i = a_i \cdot b_i + c_i$ for even $i$; $d_i = a_i \cdot b_i - c_i$ for odd $i$

The two alternating operations exist only for vectors. Vector elements are numbered from 0.

=== Compatibility ===
Although FMA3 and FMA4 have the same operations, their instructions differ in operands and encoding. Their instructions have different opcodes in different opcode maps. An instruction of one variant is an invalid opcode on a processor that supports only the other. Each variant has its own CPUID feature flag: FMA for FMA3 and FMA4 for FMA4.

Their operands differ as follows:

- FMA4 instructions have a destination and three sources. Their operands $a$, $b$, $c$, and $d$ can be four different registers. Either of the last two sources can be in memory. The fourth register is encoded in an extra byte. Each FMA4 instruction is one byte longer than the matching FMA3 instruction.
- FMA3 instructions have three operands. The result is written over the first operand. The destination $d$ is therefore the same register as $a$, $b$, or $c$. Only the third operand can be in memory. Each FMA3 operation has three operand orders numbered 132, 213, and 231. The orders differ in whether the overwritten register and the memory operand are factors or the summand. The input to be overwritten must first be copied to another register if all three inputs are still needed afterwards. The examples below contain such copies.

The split between FMA3 and FMA4 followed changes of plan by Intel and AMD. AMD Fellow Dave Christie wrote in May 2009 that AMD could not adopt Intel's December 2008 change of FMA from four to three operands without unacceptable risk to its product schedules. AMD therefore kept the four-operand form from Intel's earlier specification. Josh Walrath of PC Perspective wrote in 2009 that it was "unfortunate that AMD and Intel cannot work together a bit better on these things". Agner Fog wrote in 2009 that Intel, AMD, and VIA "are assigning different codes to identical or equivalent instructions because each keep their innovations secret for as long as possible". In 2011, he listed FMA3 and FMA4 among several pairs of AMD and Intel instructions with incompatible encodings. He wrote that Intel had given its own VEX encodings to instructions that AMD had first defined in the XOP encoding.

=== Naming ===
Intel and AMD define the same FMA3 mnemonics in their instruction-set manuals. The FMA4 mnemonics are defined only in AMD's manual. Each FMA mnemonic consists of a stem from the table above and a postfix for the data format:

- PS: packed single precision
- PD: packed double precision
- SS: scalar single precision
- SD: scalar double precision

In a packed instruction, the operation is applied to every element of a vector. In a scalar instruction, it is applied only to the lowest element. An FMA4 mnemonic is the stem followed directly by the postfix, as in VFMADDPS. In an FMA3 mnemonic, the operand order 132, 213, or 231 comes between the stem and the postfix, as in VFMADD213PS.

=== Rounding ===
The exact intermediate value of an FMA instruction exists only inside the processor and cannot be examined by software. FMA results are rounded in the rounding mode set in the processor's MXCSR control and status register. (Note: The rounding mode is set in the rounding control field of MXCSR (bits 13 and 14). The four rounding modes are round to nearest even (the default), round down, round up, and round toward zero.) For AVX-512 instructions, a rounding mode can instead be encoded in the 512-bit and scalar forms whose operands are all registers. Under IEEE 754-2008, overflow, underflow, and inexact exceptions in a fused multiply–add can arise only from the addition and not from the multiplication.

With separate multiply and add instructions, the product is rounded before the addition. The result is then rounded twice: $\operatorname{round}(\operatorname{round}(a \cdot b) + c)$. On x86 processors without FMA3 or FMA4, a result rounded only once is still available from the C fma function. Intel describes its own implementation as having some cost in speed.

=== Contraction by C compilers ===
In the C programming language, since the 1999 revision, an expression such as a * b + c may be contracted into a single fused operation. Whether contraction is allowed is controlled by the STDC FP_CONTRACT pragma, and its default status is implementation-defined. When compiling for a processor with FMA instructions:

- In GCC, which does not support the pragma, contraction is on except in a standard-conforming mode such as -std=c11.
- In Clang, contraction within a single expression has been on by default since version 14.
- In Visual C++, contraction has been off by default since Visual Studio 2022.
- In Intel's compilers, contraction is on by default at optimization level -O1 and above.

In the examples below, a * b + c is compiled into one FMA instruction.

Results of the same program can therefore differ between builds for processors with and without FMA. Without FMA, the expression $p \cdot q + r \cdot s$ with $r = p$ and $s = -q$ is zero. With FMA, either product may be the unrounded one. The two possible results can differ from zero and from each other.

Intel recommends disabling FMA instructions for the best reproducibility between processors with and without FMA. Even on systems that conform to IEEE 754-2008, a program may give different results if optimizations that change results (e.g. contraction) are not avoided.

=== Examples ===
The following C function computes $a \cdot b + c$ on four single-precision values at once, using the vector extension of GCC and Clang:

typedef float float4 __attribute__((vector_size(16)));

float4 madd(float4 a, float4 b, float4 c)
{
    return a * b + c;
}

The listings below are Clang 21's output with optimization (-O2) for FMA3 (-mfma) and for FMA4 (-mfma4), with assembler directives and Clang's comments removed. They are in Intel syntax, where the destination is the first operand. Under the System V AMD64 calling convention, the vector arguments $a$, $b$, and $c$ are passed in registers XMM0, XMM1, and XMM2, with a vector result returned in XMM0.

Compiler output for madd
FMA3 (-mfma)

madd:
    vfmadd213ps xmm0, xmm1, xmm2
    ret

FMA4 (-mfma4)

madd:
    vfmaddps xmm0, xmm0, xmm1, xmm2
    ret

In the FMA3 listing, VFMADD213PS writes the result over its first operand, $a$. In the FMA4 listing, VFMADDPS has a separate destination operand. It writes to XMM0 only because XMM0 is the return register, and could write to any other register without changing $a$.

The next function uses all six FMA operations. The array r is passed as a pointer in register RDI. In the listings, each FMA instruction is commented with the element of r that it computes.

typedef float float4 __attribute__((vector_size(16)));

void fma_all_ops(float4 a, float4 b, float4 c, float4 r[6])
{
    r[0] = a * b + c;
    r[1] = a * b - c;
    r[2] = c - a * b;
    r[3] = -(a * b) - c;
    /* subtract in even elements, add in odd */
    r[4] = __builtin_shufflevector(a * c - b, a * c + b,
                                   0, 5, 2, 7);
    /* add in even elements, subtract in odd */
    r[5] = __builtin_shufflevector(b * c + a, b * c - a,
                                   0, 5, 2, 7);
}

Every element of r depends on all three inputs, so $a$, $b$, and $c$ must stay intact until the last operation.

Compiler output for fma_all_ops
FMA3 (-mfma)

fma_all_ops:
    vmovaps xmm3, xmm1
    vfmadd213ps xmm3, xmm0, xmm2       ; r[0]
    vmovaps xmmword ptr [rdi], xmm3
    vmovaps xmm3, xmm1
    vfmsub213ps xmm3, xmm0, xmm2       ; r[1]
    vmovaps xmmword ptr [rdi + 16], xmm3
    vmovaps xmm3, xmm1
    vfnmadd213ps xmm3, xmm0, xmm2      ; r[2]
    vmovaps xmmword ptr [rdi + 32], xmm3
    vmovaps xmm3, xmm1
    vfnmsub213ps xmm3, xmm0, xmm2      ; r[3]
    vmovaps xmmword ptr [rdi + 48], xmm3
    vmovaps xmm3, xmm2
    vfmaddsub213ps xmm3, xmm0, xmm1    ; r[4]
    vmovaps xmmword ptr [rdi + 64], xmm3
    vfmsubadd213ps xmm2, xmm1, xmm0    ; r[5]
    vmovaps xmmword ptr [rdi + 80], xmm2
    ret

FMA4 (-mfma4)

fma_all_ops:
    vfmaddps xmm3, xmm0, xmm1, xmm2    ; r[0]
    vmovaps xmmword ptr [rdi], xmm3
    vfmsubps xmm3, xmm0, xmm1, xmm2    ; r[1]
    vmovaps xmmword ptr [rdi + 16], xmm3
    vfnmaddps xmm3, xmm0, xmm1, xmm2   ; r[2]
    vmovaps xmmword ptr [rdi + 32], xmm3
    vfnmsubps xmm3, xmm0, xmm1, xmm2   ; r[3]
    vmovaps xmmword ptr [rdi + 48], xmm3
    vfmaddsubps xmm3, xmm0, xmm2, xmm1 ; r[4]
    vmovaps xmmword ptr [rdi + 64], xmm3
    vfmsubaddps xmm0, xmm1, xmm2, xmm0 ; r[5]
    vmovaps xmmword ptr [rdi + 80], xmm0
    ret

Each FMA3 instruction except the last is therefore preceded by a VMOVAPS that copies an input into XMM3, and the FMA instruction then overwrites the copy. The last FMA3 instruction overwrites $c$ directly, since $c$ is not needed afterwards. In the FMA4 listing, each FMA4 instruction except the last writes its result to XMM3, which is not one of the input registers, and the last overwrites $a$, which is no longer needed. Nothing is copied, so the only VMOVAPS instructions are the stores to r.

== FMA3 instruction set ==
=== CPUs with FMA3 ===
- AMD
  - Piledriver (2012) and newer microarchitectures
    - 2nd gen APUs, "Trinity" (32nm), May 15, 2012
    - 2nd gen "Bulldozer" (bdver2) with Piledriver cores, October 23, 2012
- Intel
  - Haswell (2013) and newer processors, except Pentiums and Celerons and low-power processors based on Goldmont and Tremont, such as Jasper Lake (2021), which lack AVX and support extensions only up to SSE4.2

=== Excerpt from FMA3 ===
Supported commands include

Mnemonic	Operation	Mnemonic	Operation
VFMADD	result = + a · b + c	VFMADDSUB	result = a · b + c for i = 1, 3, ... result = a · b − c for i = 0, 2, ...
VFNMADD	result = − a · b + c	VFMADDSUB	result = a · b + c for i = 1, 3, ... result = a · b − c for i = 0, 2, ...
VFMSUB	result = + a · b − c	VFMSUBADD	result = a · b − c for i = 1, 3, ... result = a · b + c for i = 0, 2, ...
VFNMSUB	result = − a · b − c	VFMSUBADD	result = a · b − c for i = 1, 3, ... result = a · b + c for i = 0, 2, ...

Note

- VFNMADD is result = − a · b + c, not result = − (a · b + c).
- VFNMSUB generates a −0 when all inputs are zero.

Explicit order of operands is included in the mnemonic using numbers "132", "213", and "231":

Postfix 1	Operation	possible memory operand	overwrites
132	a = a · c + b	c (factor)	a (other factor)
213	a = b · a + c	c (summand)	a (factor)
231	a = b · c + a	c (factor)	a (summand)

as well as operand format (packed or scalar) and size (single or double).

Postfix 2	precision	size	Postfix 2	precision	size
SS	Single	32 bit	SD	Double	64 bit
PSx	Single	4× 32 bit	PDx	Double	2× 64 bit
PSy	Single	8× 32 bit	PDy	Double	4× 64 bit

This results in

Encoding	Mnemonic	Operands	Operation
VEX.256.66.0F38.W1 98 /r	VFMADD132PDy	ymm, ymm, ymm/m256	a = a · c + b
VEX.256.66.0F38.W0 98 /r	VFMADD132PSy	ymm, ymm, ymm/m256	a = a · c + b
VEX.128.66.0F38.W1 98 /r	VFMADD132PDx	xmm, xmm, xmm/m128	a = a · c + b
VEX.128.66.0F38.W0 98 /r	VFMADD132PSx	xmm, xmm, xmm/m128	a = a · c + b
VEX.LIG.66.0F38.W1 99 /r	VFMADD132SD	xmm, xmm, xmm/m64	a = a · c + b
VEX.LIG.66.0F38.W0 99 /r	VFMADD132SS	xmm, xmm, xmm/m32	a = a · c + b
VEX.256.66.0F38.W1 A8 /r	VFMADD213PDy	ymm, ymm, ymm/m256	a = b · a + c
VEX.256.66.0F38.W0 A8 /r	VFMADD213PSy	ymm, ymm, ymm/m256	a = b · a + c
VEX.128.66.0F38.W1 A8 /r	VFMADD213PDx	xmm, xmm, xmm/m128	a = b · a + c
VEX.128.66.0F38.W0 A8 /r	VFMADD213PSx	xmm, xmm, xmm/m128	a = b · a + c
VEX.LIG.66.0F38.W1 A9 /r	VFMADD213SD	xmm, xmm, xmm/m64	a = b · a + c
VEX.LIG.66.0F38.W0 A9 /r	VFMADD213SS	xmm, xmm, xmm/m32	a = b · a + c
VEX.256.66.0F38.W1 B8 /r	VFMADD231PDy	ymm, ymm, ymm/m256	a = b · c + a
VEX.256.66.0F38.W0 B8 /r	VFMADD231PSy	ymm, ymm, ymm/m256	a = b · c + a
VEX.128.66.0F38.W1 B8 /r	VFMADD231PDx	xmm, xmm, xmm/m128	a = b · c + a
VEX.128.66.0F38.W0 B8 /r	VFMADD231PSx	xmm, xmm, xmm/m128	a = b · c + a
VEX.LIG.66.0F38.W1 B9 /r	VFMADD231SD	xmm, xmm, xmm/m64	a = b · c + a
VEX.LIG.66.0F38.W0 B9 /r	VFMADD231SS	xmm, xmm, xmm/m32	a = b · c + a

=== AVX-512 ===
AVX-512 adds 512-bit forms of the FMA3 instructions using a new instruction encoding, the EVEX prefix. The EVEX forms keep the FMA3 mnemonics, operand orders (132, 213, 231), and opcode bytes. The VEX-encoded FMA3 forms operate on vectors of up to 256 bits and require the processor to report the FMA feature through the CPUID instruction. The EVEX forms also operate on 512-bit vectors. They require either the AVX10.1 feature or the AVX512F feature, plus AVX512VL for 128-bit and 256-bit vectors.

Processors supporting AVX-512 include:

- Intel
  - Xeon Phi Knights Landing (2016), the first processors to support AVX-512
- AMD
  - Zen 4 (2022), AMD's first AVX-512 processor, which executes 512-bit floating-point instructions, including fused multiply–add, by "double pumping" 256-bit datapaths
  - Zen 5 (2024), AMD's first core with full 512-bit floating-point datapaths and two FMA units, which executes 512-bit fused multiply–add at full width

The EVEX forms add:

- masking of the destination by an opmask register, with unselected elements either left unchanged or set to zero
- broadcast of one 32-bit or 64-bit value from memory to every element of a source vector
- a rounding mode set by the instruction itself, for 512-bit and scalar forms with register operands

The 512-bit forms add a third packed size to postfix 2:

512-bit postfixes
Postfix 2	Precision	Size	Postfix 2	Precision	Size
PSz	Single	16× 32 bit	PDz	Double	8× 64 bit

FMA3 encodings and their requirements
Encoding	Operand sizes	Masking	Broadcast	Rounding mode	Feature flag
VEX	128-bit and 256-bit packed, 32-bit and 64-bit scalar	No	No	No	FMA
EVEX.128, EVEX.256	128-bit and 256-bit packed	Yes	Yes	No	AVX512F and AVX512VL, or AVX10.1
EVEX.512	512-bit packed	Yes	Yes	Yes	AVX512F, or AVX10.1
EVEX scalar	32-bit and 64-bit scalar	Yes	No	Yes	AVX512F, or AVX10.1

In the rounding mode column, "Yes" means the instruction can set its own rounding mode. Otherwise the rounding mode set in the processor's MXCSR register applies.

For example:

Encoding	Mnemonic	Operands	Operation
EVEX.512.66.0F38.W0 98 /r	VFMADD132PSz	zmm {k}{z}, zmm, zmm/m512/m32bcst{er}	a = a · c + b

In the operands, {k} is the opmask register, {z} means unselected elements are set to zero, m32bcst is a 32-bit value broadcast from memory, and {er} means the instruction can set its own rounding mode.

== FMA4 instruction set ==
=== CPUs with FMA4 ===
- AMD
  - "Heavy Equipment" processors
    - Bulldozer-based processors, October 12, 2011
    - Piledriver-based processors
    - Steamroller-based processors
    - Excavator-based processors (including "v2")
  - Zen: WikiChip's testing shows FMA4 still appears to work (under the conditions of the tests) despite not being officially supported and not even reported by CPUID. This has also been confirmed by Agner Fog. AMD Official Web Site FMA4 Support Note ZEN CPUs = AMD ThreadRipper 1900x, R7 Pro 1800, 1700, R5 Pro 1600, 1500, R3 Pro 1300, 1200, R3 2200G, R5 2400G.
- Intel
  - Intel has not released CPUs with support for FMA4.

=== Excerpt from FMA4 ===
Mnemonic	Operands (Intel syntax)	Operation
VFMADDPD	xmm, xmm, xmm/m128, xmm/m128	a = b·c + d
VFMADDPD	ymm, ymm, ymm/m256, ymm/m256	a = b·c + d
VFMADDPS	xmm, xmm, xmm/m128, xmm/m128	a = b·c + d
VFMADDPS	ymm, ymm, ymm/m256, ymm/m256	a = b·c + d
VFMADDSD	xmm, xmm, xmm/m64, xmm/m64	a = b·c + d
VFMADDSS	xmm, xmm, xmm/m32, xmm/m32	a = b·c + d

== History ==
The incompatibility between Intel's FMA3 and AMD's FMA4 is due to both companies changing plans without coordinating coding details with each other. AMD changed their plans from FMA3 to FMA4 while Intel changed their plans from FMA4 to FMA3 almost at the same time. The history can be summarized as follows:

- August 2007: AMD announces the SSE5 instruction set, which includes 3-operand FMA instructions. A new coding scheme (DREX) is introduced for allowing instructions to have three operands.
- April 2008: Intel announces their AVX and FMA instruction sets, including 4-operand FMA instructions. The coding of these instructions uses the new VEX coding scheme, which is more flexible than AMD's DREX scheme.
- December 2008: Intel changes the specification for their FMA instructions from 4-operand to 3-operand instructions. The VEX coding scheme is still used.
- May 2009: AMD changes the specification of their FMA instructions from the 3-operand DREX form to the 4-operand VEX form, compatible with the April 2008 Intel specification rather than the December 2008 Intel specification.
- October 2011: AMD Bulldozer processor supports FMA4.
- January 2012: AMD announces FMA3 support in future processors codenamed Trinity and Vishera; they are based on the Piledriver architecture.
- May 2012: AMD Piledriver processor supports both FMA3 and FMA4.
- June 2013: Intel Haswell processor supports FMA3.
- June 2016: Intel Xeon Phi Knights Landing processors are the first to support AVX-512, which adds fused multiply–add on 512-bit vectors.
- February 2017: The first generation of AMD Ryzen processors officially supports FMA3, but not FMA4 according to the CPUID instruction. There has been confusion regarding whether FMA4 was implemented or not on this processor due to errata in the initial patch to the GNU Binutils package that has since been rectified. FMA4 worked for bit-exact bignum calculations on his Zen 1 system for years, and the one report on Reddit never had any followup investigation to rule out mistakes in the testing software before being widely repeated. The initial Ryzen CPUs could be crashed by a particular sequence of FMA3 instructions, but updated CPU microcode fixes the problem.
- July 2019: AMD Zen 2 and later Ryzen processors do not support FMA4 at all. They continue to support FMA3. Only Zen 1 and Zen+ have unofficial FMA4 support.
- September 2022: Zen 4 processors are AMD's first to support AVX-512, executing its 512-bit fused multiply–add and other floating-point instructions on 256-bit datapaths.
- August 2024: Zen 5 is AMD's first core with full 512-bit floating-point datapaths, executing 512-bit fused multiply–add at full width.

== Compiler and assembler support ==
Different compilers provide different levels of support for FMA:

- GCC supports FMA4 with -mfma4 since version 4.5.0, FMA3 with -mfma since version 4.7.0 and the AVX-512 forms of FMA3 with -mavx512f since version 4.9.0.
- Microsoft Visual C++ 2010 SP1 supports FMA4 instructions.
- Microsoft Visual C++ 2012 supports FMA3 instructions (if the processor also supports AVX2 instruction set extension).
- Microsoft Visual C++ since VC 2013
- PathScale supports FMA4 with -mfma.
- LLVM 3.1 adds FMA4 support. LLVM 3.2 adds FMA3 code generation and intrinsics.
- Open64 5.0 adds "limited support".
- Intel compilers generate FMA3 instructions when compiling for processors with AVX2 or later. They do not support FMA4.
- NASM supports FMA3 instructions since version 2.03 and FMA4 instructions since 2.06.
- FASM supports both FMA3 and FMA4 instructions.
