= Uncacheable speculative write combining =

Uncacheable speculative write combining (USWC), is a computer BIOS setting for memory communication between a CPU and graphics card. It allows faster communication than the "uncachable" setting (the alternative to USWC in the BIOS), as long as the graphics card supports write combining (which most modern cards do), allowing data to be temporarily stored in write combine buffers (WCB) and released in burst mode rather than single bits.

== See also ==
- Bus (computing)
