= Address-range register =

Address-range registers (ARR) are control registers of the Cyrix 6x86, 6x86MX and MII processors that are used as a control mechanism which provides system software with control of how accesses to memory ranges by the CPU are cached, similar to what memory type range registers (MTRRs) provide on other implementations of the x86 architecture.

== See also ==
- Write barrier
- Page attribute table
