= Agner Fog =

Danish computer scientist and anthropologist

- Education: Technical University of Denmark
- Employer: Technical University of Denmark
- Website: www.agner.org

Agner Fog is a Danish evolutionary anthropologist and computer scientist. He is currently an associate professor of computer science at the Technical University of Denmark (DTU), and has been present at DTU since 1995. He is best known for coining the term "Regality Theory" and for writing extensive optimization manuals for machines running the x86 architecture.

== Social sciences ==
Agner Fog is the main investigator of Regality Theory, the proposition that the environment a group is in selects for certain psychological traits. As a result, a harsher environment selects for more regal (warlike) social structures while a safer environment selects for more kungic (peaceful) ones.

== Programming and mathematics ==
=== Optimization ===
Agner Fog is known as a "CPU analyst" to tech websites covering x86 CPUs. He maintains a five-volume manual for optimizing code for x86 CPUs, with details on the instruction timing and other features of individual microarchitectures. He also maintains a Vector Class Library for SIMD math, an assembly subroutine library ("asmlib"), as well as many other utilities.

Agner Fog has also written extensively on the behavior of Intel C++ Compiler and Intel MKL on non-Intel CPUs, coining the term "cripple AMD" to describe the bias.

=== Vector Class Library ===
Agner Fog is the main author of the C++ Vector Class Library. This is an open source C++ class library for optimizing SIMD code.

=== ForwardCom instruction set ===
Agner Fog has designed the ForwardCom instruction set. This is a high performance open source CPU Instruction set architecture with variable-length vector registers. The instruction set is neither RISC nor CISC, but a compromise with few instructions and many variants of each instruction.

=== Other subjects ===
Fog has written a few pseudorandom number generators with a variety of distributions, with a focus on performance (SIMD) and correctness with regard to floating-point behavior and statistical properties. These are used in simulations for his anthropology research.
